

486001–486100 

|-bgcolor=#FFC2E0
| 486001 ||  || — || June 23, 2012 || Mount Lemmon || Mount Lemmon Survey || AMO || align=right data-sort-value="0.51" | 510 m || 
|-id=002 bgcolor=#d6d6d6
| 486002 ||  || — || September 10, 2007 || Mount Lemmon || Mount Lemmon Survey || Tj (2.99) || align=right | 3.4 km || 
|-id=003 bgcolor=#fefefe
| 486003 ||  || — || June 20, 2012 || Kitt Peak || Spacewatch || H || align=right data-sort-value="0.73" | 730 m || 
|-id=004 bgcolor=#fefefe
| 486004 ||  || — || November 13, 2009 || La Sagra || OAM Obs. || — || align=right data-sort-value="0.86" | 860 m || 
|-id=005 bgcolor=#fefefe
| 486005 ||  || — || September 21, 2009 || Mount Lemmon || Mount Lemmon Survey || — || align=right data-sort-value="0.63" | 630 m || 
|-id=006 bgcolor=#FA8072
| 486006 ||  || — || August 13, 2012 || Haleakala || Pan-STARRS || — || align=right | 1.0 km || 
|-id=007 bgcolor=#E9E9E9
| 486007 ||  || — || September 18, 2004 || Socorro || LINEAR || — || align=right data-sort-value="0.70" | 700 m || 
|-id=008 bgcolor=#C2FFFF
| 486008 ||  || — || September 14, 2013 || Haleakala || Pan-STARRS || L5 || align=right | 7.2 km || 
|-id=009 bgcolor=#fefefe
| 486009 ||  || — || March 30, 2011 || Haleakala || Pan-STARRS || — || align=right data-sort-value="0.69" | 690 m || 
|-id=010 bgcolor=#fefefe
| 486010 ||  || — || October 21, 2009 || Mount Lemmon || Mount Lemmon Survey || — || align=right data-sort-value="0.71" | 710 m || 
|-id=011 bgcolor=#fefefe
| 486011 ||  || — || September 16, 2001 || Socorro || LINEAR || (5026) || align=right data-sort-value="0.83" | 830 m || 
|-id=012 bgcolor=#fefefe
| 486012 ||  || — || January 10, 2007 || Kitt Peak || Spacewatch || — || align=right data-sort-value="0.78" | 780 m || 
|-id=013 bgcolor=#fefefe
| 486013 ||  || — || June 2, 2011 || Haleakala || Pan-STARRS || — || align=right | 1.2 km || 
|-id=014 bgcolor=#C2FFFF
| 486014 ||  || — || February 24, 2006 || Mount Lemmon || Mount Lemmon Survey || L5 || align=right | 8.0 km || 
|-id=015 bgcolor=#FA8072
| 486015 ||  || — || July 10, 2005 || Siding Spring || SSS || — || align=right data-sort-value="0.71" | 710 m || 
|-id=016 bgcolor=#fefefe
| 486016 ||  || — || August 26, 2012 || Haleakala || Pan-STARRS || — || align=right data-sort-value="0.96" | 960 m || 
|-id=017 bgcolor=#C2FFFF
| 486017 ||  || — || August 2, 2011 || Haleakala || Pan-STARRS || L5 || align=right | 12 km || 
|-id=018 bgcolor=#C2FFFF
| 486018 ||  || — || August 24, 2011 || Haleakala || Pan-STARRS || L5 || align=right | 8.3 km || 
|-id=019 bgcolor=#C2FFFF
| 486019 ||  || — || July 3, 2011 || Haleakala || Pan-STARRS || L5 || align=right | 7.0 km || 
|-id=020 bgcolor=#fefefe
| 486020 ||  || — || November 19, 2009 || La Sagra || OAM Obs. || — || align=right data-sort-value="0.78" | 780 m || 
|-id=021 bgcolor=#C2FFFF
| 486021 ||  || — || September 23, 2012 || Mount Lemmon || Mount Lemmon Survey || L5 || align=right | 9.3 km || 
|-id=022 bgcolor=#C2FFFF
| 486022 ||  || — || September 8, 2000 || Kitt Peak || Spacewatch || L5 || align=right | 9.7 km || 
|-id=023 bgcolor=#fefefe
| 486023 ||  || — || August 26, 2012 || Haleakala || Pan-STARRS || NYS || align=right data-sort-value="0.56" | 560 m || 
|-id=024 bgcolor=#fefefe
| 486024 ||  || — || September 12, 2001 || Socorro || LINEAR || MAS || align=right data-sort-value="0.68" | 680 m || 
|-id=025 bgcolor=#C2FFFF
| 486025 ||  || — || July 3, 2011 || Haleakala || Pan-STARRS || L5 || align=right | 9.4 km || 
|-id=026 bgcolor=#C2FFFF
| 486026 ||  || — || August 30, 2011 || Haleakala || Pan-STARRS || L5 || align=right | 8.0 km || 
|-id=027 bgcolor=#fefefe
| 486027 ||  || — || March 31, 2011 || Haleakala || Pan-STARRS || — || align=right data-sort-value="0.58" | 580 m || 
|-id=028 bgcolor=#C2FFFF
| 486028 ||  || — || February 26, 2007 || Mount Lemmon || Mount Lemmon Survey || L5 || align=right | 10 km || 
|-id=029 bgcolor=#fefefe
| 486029 ||  || — || September 3, 2008 || La Sagra || OAM Obs. || — || align=right data-sort-value="0.90" | 900 m || 
|-id=030 bgcolor=#fefefe
| 486030 ||  || — || September 16, 2012 || Mount Lemmon || Mount Lemmon Survey || — || align=right data-sort-value="0.86" | 860 m || 
|-id=031 bgcolor=#fefefe
| 486031 ||  || — || October 9, 2005 || Kitt Peak || Spacewatch || — || align=right data-sort-value="0.59" | 590 m || 
|-id=032 bgcolor=#fefefe
| 486032 ||  || — || August 29, 2005 || Kitt Peak || Spacewatch || — || align=right data-sort-value="0.62" | 620 m || 
|-id=033 bgcolor=#C2FFFF
| 486033 ||  || — || September 21, 2012 || Kitt Peak || Spacewatch || L5 || align=right | 7.7 km || 
|-id=034 bgcolor=#fefefe
| 486034 ||  || — || October 26, 2005 || Kitt Peak || Spacewatch || — || align=right data-sort-value="0.68" | 680 m || 
|-id=035 bgcolor=#fefefe
| 486035 ||  || — || October 15, 2001 || Kitt Peak || Spacewatch || MAS || align=right data-sort-value="0.51" | 510 m || 
|-id=036 bgcolor=#fefefe
| 486036 ||  || — || March 20, 2010 || Catalina || CSS || — || align=right data-sort-value="0.85" | 850 m || 
|-id=037 bgcolor=#fefefe
| 486037 ||  || — || October 1, 2008 || Mount Lemmon || Mount Lemmon Survey || — || align=right data-sort-value="0.78" | 780 m || 
|-id=038 bgcolor=#fefefe
| 486038 ||  || — || October 1, 2005 || Catalina || CSS || — || align=right data-sort-value="0.78" | 780 m || 
|-id=039 bgcolor=#C2FFFF
| 486039 ||  || — || May 7, 2010 || WISE || WISE || L5 || align=right | 5.9 km || 
|-id=040 bgcolor=#fefefe
| 486040 ||  || — || September 14, 2012 || Catalina || CSS || — || align=right data-sort-value="0.87" | 870 m || 
|-id=041 bgcolor=#C2FFFF
| 486041 ||  || — || October 7, 2012 || Haleakala || Pan-STARRS || L5 || align=right | 8.5 km || 
|-id=042 bgcolor=#FA8072
| 486042 ||  || — || October 8, 2012 || Mount Lemmon || Mount Lemmon Survey || — || align=right data-sort-value="0.94" | 940 m || 
|-id=043 bgcolor=#fefefe
| 486043 ||  || — || October 29, 2005 || Catalina || CSS || — || align=right data-sort-value="0.78" | 780 m || 
|-id=044 bgcolor=#C2FFFF
| 486044 ||  || — || August 24, 2011 || Haleakala || Pan-STARRS || L5 || align=right | 6.8 km || 
|-id=045 bgcolor=#fefefe
| 486045 ||  || — || December 10, 2009 || Mount Lemmon || Mount Lemmon Survey || — || align=right data-sort-value="0.65" | 650 m || 
|-id=046 bgcolor=#fefefe
| 486046 ||  || — || February 14, 2010 || Mount Lemmon || Mount Lemmon Survey || MAS || align=right data-sort-value="0.52" | 520 m || 
|-id=047 bgcolor=#fefefe
| 486047 ||  || — || March 10, 2007 || Mount Lemmon || Mount Lemmon Survey || — || align=right data-sort-value="0.82" | 820 m || 
|-id=048 bgcolor=#fefefe
| 486048 ||  || — || August 28, 2005 || Kitt Peak || Spacewatch || — || align=right data-sort-value="0.62" | 620 m || 
|-id=049 bgcolor=#fefefe
| 486049 ||  || — || October 25, 2005 || Kitt Peak || Spacewatch || — || align=right data-sort-value="0.57" | 570 m || 
|-id=050 bgcolor=#fefefe
| 486050 ||  || — || October 2, 1995 || Kitt Peak || Spacewatch || — || align=right data-sort-value="0.57" | 570 m || 
|-id=051 bgcolor=#fefefe
| 486051 ||  || — || November 18, 2009 || Kitt Peak || Spacewatch || — || align=right data-sort-value="0.59" | 590 m || 
|-id=052 bgcolor=#fefefe
| 486052 ||  || — || July 31, 2008 || La Sagra || OAM Obs. || — || align=right | 1.1 km || 
|-id=053 bgcolor=#fefefe
| 486053 ||  || — || October 25, 2005 || Kitt Peak || Spacewatch || — || align=right data-sort-value="0.68" | 680 m || 
|-id=054 bgcolor=#fefefe
| 486054 ||  || — || March 13, 2010 || Mount Lemmon || Mount Lemmon Survey || NYS || align=right data-sort-value="0.60" | 600 m || 
|-id=055 bgcolor=#E9E9E9
| 486055 ||  || — || September 17, 2012 || La Sagra || OAM Obs. || — || align=right | 2.1 km || 
|-id=056 bgcolor=#fefefe
| 486056 ||  || — || September 1, 2005 || Kitt Peak || Spacewatch || — || align=right data-sort-value="0.60" | 600 m || 
|-id=057 bgcolor=#C2FFFF
| 486057 ||  || — || August 29, 2011 || Haleakala || Pan-STARRS || L5 || align=right | 7.4 km || 
|-id=058 bgcolor=#fefefe
| 486058 ||  || — || November 9, 2009 || Mount Lemmon || Mount Lemmon Survey || — || align=right data-sort-value="0.57" | 570 m || 
|-id=059 bgcolor=#fefefe
| 486059 ||  || — || October 7, 2012 || Haleakala || Pan-STARRS || V || align=right data-sort-value="0.57" | 570 m || 
|-id=060 bgcolor=#C2FFFF
| 486060 ||  || — || October 7, 2012 || Haleakala || Pan-STARRS || L5 || align=right | 8.3 km || 
|-id=061 bgcolor=#fefefe
| 486061 ||  || — || October 6, 2005 || Kitt Peak || Spacewatch || — || align=right data-sort-value="0.71" | 710 m || 
|-id=062 bgcolor=#fefefe
| 486062 ||  || — || September 7, 1999 || Socorro || LINEAR || — || align=right data-sort-value="0.61" | 610 m || 
|-id=063 bgcolor=#fefefe
| 486063 ||  || — || October 13, 2012 || Kitt Peak || Spacewatch || — || align=right data-sort-value="0.75" | 750 m || 
|-id=064 bgcolor=#fefefe
| 486064 ||  || — || October 8, 2012 || Haleakala || Pan-STARRS || — || align=right data-sort-value="0.62" | 620 m || 
|-id=065 bgcolor=#fefefe
| 486065 ||  || — || September 20, 2001 || Socorro || LINEAR || — || align=right data-sort-value="0.68" | 680 m || 
|-id=066 bgcolor=#fefefe
| 486066 ||  || — || October 25, 2005 || Catalina || CSS || V || align=right data-sort-value="0.67" | 670 m || 
|-id=067 bgcolor=#fefefe
| 486067 ||  || — || September 16, 2012 || Kitt Peak || Spacewatch || — || align=right data-sort-value="0.71" | 710 m || 
|-id=068 bgcolor=#fefefe
| 486068 ||  || — || October 29, 2005 || Mount Lemmon || Mount Lemmon Survey || — || align=right data-sort-value="0.77" | 770 m || 
|-id=069 bgcolor=#fefefe
| 486069 ||  || — || September 6, 2008 || La Sagra || OAM Obs. || — || align=right data-sort-value="0.76" | 760 m || 
|-id=070 bgcolor=#fefefe
| 486070 ||  || — || December 18, 2009 || Mount Lemmon || Mount Lemmon Survey || — || align=right data-sort-value="0.98" | 980 m || 
|-id=071 bgcolor=#fefefe
| 486071 ||  || — || November 20, 2009 || Mount Lemmon || Mount Lemmon Survey || — || align=right data-sort-value="0.59" | 590 m || 
|-id=072 bgcolor=#fefefe
| 486072 ||  || — || October 22, 2005 || Kitt Peak || Spacewatch || — || align=right data-sort-value="0.67" | 670 m || 
|-id=073 bgcolor=#C2FFFF
| 486073 ||  || — || October 10, 2012 || Mount Lemmon || Mount Lemmon Survey || L5 || align=right | 7.8 km || 
|-id=074 bgcolor=#C2FFFF
| 486074 ||  || — || September 19, 2011 || Mount Lemmon || Mount Lemmon Survey || L5 || align=right | 7.0 km || 
|-id=075 bgcolor=#fefefe
| 486075 ||  || — || October 17, 2012 || Mount Lemmon || Mount Lemmon Survey || — || align=right data-sort-value="0.68" | 680 m || 
|-id=076 bgcolor=#fefefe
| 486076 ||  || — || December 4, 2005 || Mount Lemmon || Mount Lemmon Survey || — || align=right data-sort-value="0.59" | 590 m || 
|-id=077 bgcolor=#fefefe
| 486077 ||  || — || March 31, 2011 || Haleakala || Pan-STARRS || — || align=right data-sort-value="0.73" | 730 m || 
|-id=078 bgcolor=#fefefe
| 486078 ||  || — || December 25, 2005 || Kitt Peak || Spacewatch || — || align=right data-sort-value="0.59" | 590 m || 
|-id=079 bgcolor=#fefefe
| 486079 ||  || — || October 24, 2005 || Kitt Peak || Spacewatch || — || align=right data-sort-value="0.68" | 680 m || 
|-id=080 bgcolor=#fefefe
| 486080 ||  || — || October 1, 2005 || Mount Lemmon || Mount Lemmon Survey || — || align=right | 1.9 km || 
|-id=081 bgcolor=#fefefe
| 486081 ||  || — || October 17, 2012 || Haleakala || Pan-STARRS || — || align=right data-sort-value="0.57" | 570 m || 
|-id=082 bgcolor=#fefefe
| 486082 ||  || — || October 28, 2005 || Kitt Peak || Spacewatch || — || align=right data-sort-value="0.57" | 570 m || 
|-id=083 bgcolor=#fefefe
| 486083 ||  || — || October 24, 2005 || Kitt Peak || Spacewatch || — || align=right data-sort-value="0.60" | 600 m || 
|-id=084 bgcolor=#fefefe
| 486084 ||  || — || November 1, 2005 || Mount Lemmon || Mount Lemmon Survey || — || align=right data-sort-value="0.58" | 580 m || 
|-id=085 bgcolor=#fefefe
| 486085 ||  || — || November 4, 2005 || Mount Lemmon || Mount Lemmon Survey || — || align=right data-sort-value="0.70" | 700 m || 
|-id=086 bgcolor=#fefefe
| 486086 ||  || — || October 1, 2005 || Kitt Peak || Spacewatch || — || align=right data-sort-value="0.60" | 600 m || 
|-id=087 bgcolor=#fefefe
| 486087 ||  || — || October 24, 2005 || Kitt Peak || Spacewatch || — || align=right data-sort-value="0.68" | 680 m || 
|-id=088 bgcolor=#fefefe
| 486088 ||  || — || December 5, 2005 || Mount Lemmon || Mount Lemmon Survey || MAS || align=right data-sort-value="0.59" | 590 m || 
|-id=089 bgcolor=#fefefe
| 486089 ||  || — || January 8, 2010 || Mount Lemmon || Mount Lemmon Survey || (2076) || align=right data-sort-value="0.86" | 860 m || 
|-id=090 bgcolor=#fefefe
| 486090 ||  || — || October 23, 2005 || Catalina || CSS || — || align=right data-sort-value="0.78" | 780 m || 
|-id=091 bgcolor=#E9E9E9
| 486091 ||  || — || September 30, 2008 || La Sagra || OAM Obs. || — || align=right | 1.8 km || 
|-id=092 bgcolor=#fefefe
| 486092 ||  || — || October 19, 2012 || Mount Lemmon || Mount Lemmon Survey || — || align=right data-sort-value="0.82" | 820 m || 
|-id=093 bgcolor=#fefefe
| 486093 ||  || — || February 14, 2010 || Mount Lemmon || Mount Lemmon Survey || — || align=right data-sort-value="0.73" | 730 m || 
|-id=094 bgcolor=#fefefe
| 486094 ||  || — || October 24, 2005 || Kitt Peak || Spacewatch || — || align=right data-sort-value="0.59" | 590 m || 
|-id=095 bgcolor=#fefefe
| 486095 ||  || — || September 14, 2012 || Catalina || CSS || — || align=right data-sort-value="0.98" | 980 m || 
|-id=096 bgcolor=#E9E9E9
| 486096 ||  || — || June 6, 2011 || Haleakala || Pan-STARRS || — || align=right | 1.7 km || 
|-id=097 bgcolor=#fefefe
| 486097 ||  || — || October 31, 2005 || Catalina || CSS || — || align=right | 1.2 km || 
|-id=098 bgcolor=#fefefe
| 486098 ||  || — || August 31, 2005 || Kitt Peak || Spacewatch || — || align=right data-sort-value="0.78" | 780 m || 
|-id=099 bgcolor=#fefefe
| 486099 ||  || — || July 26, 2001 || Kitt Peak || Spacewatch || — || align=right data-sort-value="0.89" | 890 m || 
|-id=100 bgcolor=#E9E9E9
| 486100 ||  || — || October 10, 2012 || Haleakala || Pan-STARRS || — || align=right | 1.3 km || 
|}

486101–486200 

|-bgcolor=#fefefe
| 486101 ||  || — || October 12, 2005 || Kitt Peak || Spacewatch || — || align=right data-sort-value="0.59" | 590 m || 
|-id=102 bgcolor=#fefefe
| 486102 ||  || — || October 11, 2005 || Kitt Peak || Spacewatch || — || align=right data-sort-value="0.47" | 470 m || 
|-id=103 bgcolor=#fefefe
| 486103 ||  || — || October 27, 2005 || Kitt Peak || Spacewatch || NYS || align=right data-sort-value="0.52" | 520 m || 
|-id=104 bgcolor=#fefefe
| 486104 ||  || — || January 13, 2010 || Mount Lemmon || Mount Lemmon Survey || — || align=right data-sort-value="0.68" | 680 m || 
|-id=105 bgcolor=#fefefe
| 486105 ||  || — || September 4, 2008 || La Sagra || OAM Obs. || — || align=right | 1.0 km || 
|-id=106 bgcolor=#fefefe
| 486106 ||  || — || October 8, 2012 || Kitt Peak || Spacewatch || — || align=right data-sort-value="0.73" | 730 m || 
|-id=107 bgcolor=#fefefe
| 486107 ||  || — || October 21, 2012 || Haleakala || Pan-STARRS || — || align=right data-sort-value="0.83" | 830 m || 
|-id=108 bgcolor=#fefefe
| 486108 ||  || — || November 7, 2012 || Haleakala || Pan-STARRS || — || align=right | 1.00 km || 
|-id=109 bgcolor=#fefefe
| 486109 ||  || — || November 12, 2012 || Mount Lemmon || Mount Lemmon Survey || NYS || align=right data-sort-value="0.44" | 440 m || 
|-id=110 bgcolor=#fefefe
| 486110 ||  || — || October 30, 2005 || Mount Lemmon || Mount Lemmon Survey || — || align=right data-sort-value="0.57" | 570 m || 
|-id=111 bgcolor=#fefefe
| 486111 ||  || — || October 25, 2005 || Kitt Peak || Spacewatch || — || align=right data-sort-value="0.57" | 570 m || 
|-id=112 bgcolor=#fefefe
| 486112 ||  || — || October 21, 2012 || Haleakala || Pan-STARRS || — || align=right data-sort-value="0.74" | 740 m || 
|-id=113 bgcolor=#fefefe
| 486113 ||  || — || September 6, 2008 || Catalina || CSS || — || align=right data-sort-value="0.77" | 770 m || 
|-id=114 bgcolor=#E9E9E9
| 486114 ||  || — || January 30, 2011 || Haleakala || Pan-STARRS || — || align=right | 1.5 km || 
|-id=115 bgcolor=#fefefe
| 486115 ||  || — || February 13, 2010 || Mount Lemmon || Mount Lemmon Survey || (2076) || align=right data-sort-value="0.68" | 680 m || 
|-id=116 bgcolor=#fefefe
| 486116 ||  || — || September 4, 2008 || Kitt Peak || Spacewatch || — || align=right data-sort-value="0.62" | 620 m || 
|-id=117 bgcolor=#fefefe
| 486117 ||  || — || November 21, 2009 || Mount Lemmon || Mount Lemmon Survey || — || align=right data-sort-value="0.78" | 780 m || 
|-id=118 bgcolor=#fefefe
| 486118 ||  || — || September 29, 2008 || Catalina || CSS || NYS || align=right data-sort-value="0.59" | 590 m || 
|-id=119 bgcolor=#fefefe
| 486119 ||  || — || December 5, 2005 || Mount Lemmon || Mount Lemmon Survey || — || align=right data-sort-value="0.68" | 680 m || 
|-id=120 bgcolor=#fefefe
| 486120 ||  || — || November 21, 2005 || Kitt Peak || Spacewatch || — || align=right data-sort-value="0.80" | 800 m || 
|-id=121 bgcolor=#fefefe
| 486121 ||  || — || October 25, 2005 || Mount Lemmon || Mount Lemmon Survey || — || align=right data-sort-value="0.57" | 570 m || 
|-id=122 bgcolor=#E9E9E9
| 486122 ||  || — || December 20, 2008 || La Sagra || OAM Obs. || — || align=right | 1.0 km || 
|-id=123 bgcolor=#fefefe
| 486123 ||  || — || October 9, 2012 || Haleakala || Pan-STARRS || — || align=right | 1.1 km || 
|-id=124 bgcolor=#fefefe
| 486124 ||  || — || October 21, 2012 || Haleakala || Pan-STARRS || — || align=right data-sort-value="0.89" | 890 m || 
|-id=125 bgcolor=#fefefe
| 486125 ||  || — || March 18, 2010 || Mount Lemmon || Mount Lemmon Survey || — || align=right data-sort-value="0.52" | 520 m || 
|-id=126 bgcolor=#E9E9E9
| 486126 ||  || — || September 2, 2012 || Haleakala || Pan-STARRS || — || align=right | 1.1 km || 
|-id=127 bgcolor=#fefefe
| 486127 ||  || — || October 7, 2008 || Mount Lemmon || Mount Lemmon Survey || — || align=right data-sort-value="0.70" | 700 m || 
|-id=128 bgcolor=#fefefe
| 486128 ||  || — || November 5, 2012 || Kitt Peak || Spacewatch || — || align=right data-sort-value="0.78" | 780 m || 
|-id=129 bgcolor=#fefefe
| 486129 ||  || — || January 2, 2006 || Mount Lemmon || Mount Lemmon Survey || — || align=right data-sort-value="0.68" | 680 m || 
|-id=130 bgcolor=#fefefe
| 486130 ||  || — || November 19, 2012 || Kitt Peak || Spacewatch || — || align=right data-sort-value="0.65" | 650 m || 
|-id=131 bgcolor=#fefefe
| 486131 ||  || — || September 19, 2008 || Kitt Peak || Spacewatch || MAS || align=right data-sort-value="0.67" | 670 m || 
|-id=132 bgcolor=#fefefe
| 486132 ||  || — || November 30, 2005 || Kitt Peak || Spacewatch || — || align=right data-sort-value="0.78" | 780 m || 
|-id=133 bgcolor=#fefefe
| 486133 ||  || — || December 7, 2005 || Kitt Peak || Spacewatch || — || align=right data-sort-value="0.71" | 710 m || 
|-id=134 bgcolor=#fefefe
| 486134 ||  || — || October 16, 2012 || Kitt Peak || Spacewatch || — || align=right data-sort-value="0.82" | 820 m || 
|-id=135 bgcolor=#fefefe
| 486135 ||  || — || October 23, 2005 || Catalina || CSS || — || align=right data-sort-value="0.65" | 650 m || 
|-id=136 bgcolor=#fefefe
| 486136 ||  || — || December 18, 2001 || Socorro || LINEAR || — || align=right data-sort-value="0.82" | 820 m || 
|-id=137 bgcolor=#fefefe
| 486137 ||  || — || August 3, 2008 || La Sagra || OAM Obs. || — || align=right data-sort-value="0.78" | 780 m || 
|-id=138 bgcolor=#fefefe
| 486138 ||  || — || March 15, 2007 || Mount Lemmon || Mount Lemmon Survey || — || align=right data-sort-value="0.65" | 650 m || 
|-id=139 bgcolor=#fefefe
| 486139 ||  || — || September 6, 2008 || Kitt Peak || Spacewatch || — || align=right data-sort-value="0.53" | 530 m || 
|-id=140 bgcolor=#E9E9E9
| 486140 ||  || — || May 24, 2011 || Haleakala || Pan-STARRS || — || align=right | 1.3 km || 
|-id=141 bgcolor=#fefefe
| 486141 ||  || — || September 19, 2008 || Kitt Peak || Spacewatch || — || align=right data-sort-value="0.68" | 680 m || 
|-id=142 bgcolor=#fefefe
| 486142 ||  || — || April 6, 2011 || Mount Lemmon || Mount Lemmon Survey || — || align=right data-sort-value="0.75" | 750 m || 
|-id=143 bgcolor=#fefefe
| 486143 ||  || — || August 1, 2008 || La Sagra || OAM Obs. || — || align=right data-sort-value="0.75" | 750 m || 
|-id=144 bgcolor=#fefefe
| 486144 ||  || — || September 4, 2008 || Kitt Peak || Spacewatch || — || align=right data-sort-value="0.68" | 680 m || 
|-id=145 bgcolor=#fefefe
| 486145 ||  || — || January 27, 2006 || Mount Lemmon || Mount Lemmon Survey || MAS || align=right data-sort-value="0.65" | 650 m || 
|-id=146 bgcolor=#fefefe
| 486146 ||  || — || September 7, 2008 || Mount Lemmon || Mount Lemmon Survey || — || align=right data-sort-value="0.62" | 620 m || 
|-id=147 bgcolor=#E9E9E9
| 486147 ||  || — || November 22, 2008 || Kitt Peak || Spacewatch || — || align=right data-sort-value="0.98" | 980 m || 
|-id=148 bgcolor=#fefefe
| 486148 ||  || — || October 26, 2008 || Mount Lemmon || Mount Lemmon Survey || — || align=right data-sort-value="0.86" | 860 m || 
|-id=149 bgcolor=#E9E9E9
| 486149 ||  || — || November 16, 1999 || Kitt Peak || Spacewatch || ADE || align=right | 1.2 km || 
|-id=150 bgcolor=#fefefe
| 486150 ||  || — || November 7, 2012 || Mount Lemmon || Mount Lemmon Survey || — || align=right data-sort-value="0.89" | 890 m || 
|-id=151 bgcolor=#fefefe
| 486151 ||  || — || December 27, 2005 || Kitt Peak || Spacewatch || — || align=right data-sort-value="0.54" | 540 m || 
|-id=152 bgcolor=#fefefe
| 486152 ||  || — || November 14, 2012 || Kitt Peak || Spacewatch || — || align=right data-sort-value="0.60" | 600 m || 
|-id=153 bgcolor=#E9E9E9
| 486153 ||  || — || November 25, 2012 || Haleakala || Pan-STARRS || — || align=right | 1.8 km || 
|-id=154 bgcolor=#fefefe
| 486154 ||  || — || September 20, 2011 || Haleakala || Pan-STARRS || — || align=right | 1.0 km || 
|-id=155 bgcolor=#E9E9E9
| 486155 ||  || — || December 7, 2012 || Kitt Peak || Spacewatch || — || align=right | 2.6 km || 
|-id=156 bgcolor=#fefefe
| 486156 ||  || — || September 4, 2008 || Kitt Peak || Spacewatch || — || align=right data-sort-value="0.71" | 710 m || 
|-id=157 bgcolor=#fefefe
| 486157 ||  || — || February 5, 2006 || Mount Lemmon || Mount Lemmon Survey || NYS || align=right data-sort-value="0.63" | 630 m || 
|-id=158 bgcolor=#fefefe
| 486158 ||  || — || December 22, 2005 || Catalina || CSS || — || align=right data-sort-value="0.90" | 900 m || 
|-id=159 bgcolor=#E9E9E9
| 486159 ||  || — || December 22, 2008 || Kitt Peak || Spacewatch || — || align=right data-sort-value="0.74" | 740 m || 
|-id=160 bgcolor=#fefefe
| 486160 ||  || — || December 8, 2012 || Kitt Peak || Spacewatch || — || align=right data-sort-value="0.93" | 930 m || 
|-id=161 bgcolor=#E9E9E9
| 486161 ||  || — || December 9, 2012 || Haleakala || Pan-STARRS || — || align=right | 1.4 km || 
|-id=162 bgcolor=#E9E9E9
| 486162 ||  || — || June 5, 2011 || Mount Lemmon || Mount Lemmon Survey || — || align=right | 1.4 km || 
|-id=163 bgcolor=#fefefe
| 486163 ||  || — || November 7, 2012 || Haleakala || Pan-STARRS || — || align=right data-sort-value="0.84" | 840 m || 
|-id=164 bgcolor=#E9E9E9
| 486164 ||  || — || December 7, 2012 || Haleakala || Pan-STARRS || — || align=right | 1.3 km || 
|-id=165 bgcolor=#fefefe
| 486165 ||  || — || December 18, 2001 || Socorro || LINEAR || — || align=right data-sort-value="0.95" | 950 m || 
|-id=166 bgcolor=#fefefe
| 486166 ||  || — || September 28, 2008 || Mount Lemmon || Mount Lemmon Survey || MAS || align=right data-sort-value="0.52" | 520 m || 
|-id=167 bgcolor=#fefefe
| 486167 ||  || — || November 1, 2005 || Mount Lemmon || Mount Lemmon Survey || — || align=right data-sort-value="0.71" | 710 m || 
|-id=168 bgcolor=#E9E9E9
| 486168 ||  || — || November 4, 2008 || Kitt Peak || Spacewatch || JUN || align=right | 1.1 km || 
|-id=169 bgcolor=#fefefe
| 486169 ||  || — || December 12, 2012 || Mount Lemmon || Mount Lemmon Survey || — || align=right | 1.0 km || 
|-id=170 bgcolor=#E9E9E9
| 486170 Zolnowska ||  ||  || December 10, 2012 || Tincana || M. Żołnowski, M. Kusiak || — || align=right | 1.4 km || 
|-id=171 bgcolor=#FA8072
| 486171 ||  || — || June 20, 2006 || Kitt Peak || Spacewatch || — || align=right data-sort-value="0.49" | 490 m || 
|-id=172 bgcolor=#fefefe
| 486172 ||  || — || December 13, 2012 || Kitt Peak || Spacewatch || — || align=right data-sort-value="0.98" | 980 m || 
|-id=173 bgcolor=#FA8072
| 486173 ||  || — || December 3, 2008 || Catalina || CSS || — || align=right data-sort-value="0.65" | 650 m || 
|-id=174 bgcolor=#fefefe
| 486174 ||  || — || November 30, 2008 || Mount Lemmon || Mount Lemmon Survey || NYS || align=right data-sort-value="0.54" | 540 m || 
|-id=175 bgcolor=#fefefe
| 486175 ||  || — || February 10, 2010 || WISE || WISE || critical || align=right data-sort-value="0.98" | 980 m || 
|-id=176 bgcolor=#E9E9E9
| 486176 ||  || — || December 23, 2012 || Haleakala || Pan-STARRS || — || align=right | 1.6 km || 
|-id=177 bgcolor=#d6d6d6
| 486177 ||  || — || October 18, 2011 || Haleakala || Pan-STARRS || — || align=right | 3.1 km || 
|-id=178 bgcolor=#E9E9E9
| 486178 ||  || — || November 12, 2012 || Mount Lemmon || Mount Lemmon Survey || — || align=right | 1.5 km || 
|-id=179 bgcolor=#fefefe
| 486179 ||  || — || October 4, 2008 || Catalina || CSS || — || align=right | 1.0 km || 
|-id=180 bgcolor=#fefefe
| 486180 ||  || — || January 3, 2013 || Catalina || CSS || NYS || align=right data-sort-value="0.68" | 680 m || 
|-id=181 bgcolor=#fefefe
| 486181 ||  || — || December 19, 2008 || La Sagra || OAM Obs. || — || align=right data-sort-value="0.98" | 980 m || 
|-id=182 bgcolor=#fefefe
| 486182 ||  || — || December 1, 2008 || Catalina || CSS || — || align=right data-sort-value="0.83" | 830 m || 
|-id=183 bgcolor=#E9E9E9
| 486183 ||  || — || January 3, 2013 || Haleakala || Pan-STARRS || — || align=right | 1.4 km || 
|-id=184 bgcolor=#E9E9E9
| 486184 ||  || — || September 19, 2011 || Haleakala || Pan-STARRS || — || align=right | 1.1 km || 
|-id=185 bgcolor=#E9E9E9
| 486185 ||  || — || December 3, 2008 || Mount Lemmon || Mount Lemmon Survey || — || align=right | 1.2 km || 
|-id=186 bgcolor=#fefefe
| 486186 ||  || — || December 13, 2004 || Campo Imperatore || CINEOS || — || align=right data-sort-value="0.85" | 850 m || 
|-id=187 bgcolor=#fefefe
| 486187 ||  || — || April 9, 2010 || Mount Lemmon || Mount Lemmon Survey || — || align=right data-sort-value="0.87" | 870 m || 
|-id=188 bgcolor=#fefefe
| 486188 ||  || — || April 29, 2006 || Kitt Peak || Spacewatch || — || align=right data-sort-value="0.76" | 760 m || 
|-id=189 bgcolor=#fefefe
| 486189 ||  || — || December 23, 2012 || Haleakala || Pan-STARRS || NYS || align=right data-sort-value="0.59" | 590 m || 
|-id=190 bgcolor=#E9E9E9
| 486190 ||  || — || December 22, 2008 || Kitt Peak || Spacewatch || — || align=right | 1.1 km || 
|-id=191 bgcolor=#fefefe
| 486191 ||  || — || May 25, 2006 || Kitt Peak || Spacewatch || — || align=right | 1.1 km || 
|-id=192 bgcolor=#E9E9E9
| 486192 ||  || — || January 3, 2009 || Mount Lemmon || Mount Lemmon Survey || — || align=right data-sort-value="0.70" | 700 m || 
|-id=193 bgcolor=#E9E9E9
| 486193 ||  || — || July 27, 2011 || Haleakala || Pan-STARRS || — || align=right | 1.4 km || 
|-id=194 bgcolor=#fefefe
| 486194 ||  || — || January 1, 2009 || Kitt Peak || Spacewatch || — || align=right data-sort-value="0.77" | 770 m || 
|-id=195 bgcolor=#E9E9E9
| 486195 ||  || — || January 17, 2009 || Kitt Peak || Spacewatch || — || align=right | 1.1 km || 
|-id=196 bgcolor=#E9E9E9
| 486196 ||  || — || December 13, 2012 || Mount Lemmon || Mount Lemmon Survey || — || align=right | 1.7 km || 
|-id=197 bgcolor=#E9E9E9
| 486197 ||  || — || December 30, 2008 || Catalina || CSS || — || align=right | 1.2 km || 
|-id=198 bgcolor=#E9E9E9
| 486198 ||  || — || November 14, 2007 || Mount Lemmon || Mount Lemmon Survey || — || align=right | 2.4 km || 
|-id=199 bgcolor=#E9E9E9
| 486199 ||  || — || February 27, 2009 || Catalina || CSS || — || align=right | 1.5 km || 
|-id=200 bgcolor=#fefefe
| 486200 ||  || — || December 2, 2008 || Kitt Peak || Spacewatch || — || align=right data-sort-value="0.73" | 730 m || 
|}

486201–486300 

|-bgcolor=#fefefe
| 486201 ||  || — || August 27, 2011 || Haleakala || Pan-STARRS || — || align=right | 1.0 km || 
|-id=202 bgcolor=#E9E9E9
| 486202 ||  || — || September 19, 2011 || Haleakala || Pan-STARRS || — || align=right | 1.7 km || 
|-id=203 bgcolor=#fefefe
| 486203 ||  || — || December 2, 2008 || Kitt Peak || Spacewatch || — || align=right | 1.0 km || 
|-id=204 bgcolor=#fefefe
| 486204 ||  || — || August 31, 2011 || Haleakala || Pan-STARRS || V || align=right data-sort-value="0.87" | 870 m || 
|-id=205 bgcolor=#fefefe
| 486205 ||  || — || August 24, 2011 || Haleakala || Pan-STARRS || — || align=right | 1.1 km || 
|-id=206 bgcolor=#E9E9E9
| 486206 ||  || — || February 4, 2009 || Mount Lemmon || Mount Lemmon Survey || — || align=right data-sort-value="0.83" | 830 m || 
|-id=207 bgcolor=#fefefe
| 486207 ||  || — || April 25, 2006 || Kitt Peak || Spacewatch || — || align=right data-sort-value="0.88" | 880 m || 
|-id=208 bgcolor=#fefefe
| 486208 ||  || — || November 18, 2008 || Kitt Peak || Spacewatch || — || align=right data-sort-value="0.75" | 750 m || 
|-id=209 bgcolor=#E9E9E9
| 486209 ||  || — || December 23, 2012 || Haleakala || Pan-STARRS || — || align=right data-sort-value="0.92" | 920 m || 
|-id=210 bgcolor=#fefefe
| 486210 ||  || — || March 24, 2006 || Kitt Peak || Spacewatch || — || align=right data-sort-value="0.82" | 820 m || 
|-id=211 bgcolor=#fefefe
| 486211 ||  || — || December 3, 2008 || Kitt Peak || Spacewatch || — || align=right data-sort-value="0.95" | 950 m || 
|-id=212 bgcolor=#E9E9E9
| 486212 ||  || — || January 3, 2013 || Haleakala || Pan-STARRS || — || align=right | 2.3 km || 
|-id=213 bgcolor=#fefefe
| 486213 ||  || — || December 23, 2012 || Haleakala || Pan-STARRS || — || align=right data-sort-value="0.72" | 720 m || 
|-id=214 bgcolor=#fefefe
| 486214 ||  || — || November 30, 2008 || Kitt Peak || Spacewatch || — || align=right data-sort-value="0.67" | 670 m || 
|-id=215 bgcolor=#fefefe
| 486215 ||  || — || December 25, 2005 || Kitt Peak || Spacewatch || — || align=right data-sort-value="0.75" | 750 m || 
|-id=216 bgcolor=#E9E9E9
| 486216 ||  || — || December 23, 2012 || Haleakala || Pan-STARRS || — || align=right | 1.8 km || 
|-id=217 bgcolor=#E9E9E9
| 486217 ||  || — || September 24, 2011 || Haleakala || Pan-STARRS || — || align=right | 2.8 km || 
|-id=218 bgcolor=#E9E9E9
| 486218 ||  || — || September 13, 2007 || Catalina || CSS || — || align=right | 1.7 km || 
|-id=219 bgcolor=#fefefe
| 486219 ||  || — || November 19, 2008 || Kitt Peak || Spacewatch || — || align=right data-sort-value="0.62" | 620 m || 
|-id=220 bgcolor=#FA8072
| 486220 ||  || — || October 31, 2012 || Haleakala || Pan-STARRS || — || align=right | 1.0 km || 
|-id=221 bgcolor=#fefefe
| 486221 ||  || — || January 26, 2006 || Kitt Peak || Spacewatch || — || align=right data-sort-value="0.65" | 650 m || 
|-id=222 bgcolor=#E9E9E9
| 486222 ||  || — || February 24, 2009 || Kitt Peak || Spacewatch || — || align=right | 1.4 km || 
|-id=223 bgcolor=#E9E9E9
| 486223 ||  || — || January 15, 2009 || Kitt Peak || Spacewatch || — || align=right data-sort-value="0.93" | 930 m || 
|-id=224 bgcolor=#fefefe
| 486224 ||  || — || December 18, 2004 || Mount Lemmon || Mount Lemmon Survey || MAS || align=right data-sort-value="0.76" | 760 m || 
|-id=225 bgcolor=#fefefe
| 486225 ||  || — || January 2, 2013 || Mount Lemmon || Mount Lemmon Survey || — || align=right data-sort-value="0.94" | 940 m || 
|-id=226 bgcolor=#E9E9E9
| 486226 ||  || — || January 18, 2009 || Kitt Peak || Spacewatch || — || align=right data-sort-value="0.81" | 810 m || 
|-id=227 bgcolor=#fefefe
| 486227 ||  || — || January 10, 2013 || Haleakala || Pan-STARRS || — || align=right data-sort-value="0.95" | 950 m || 
|-id=228 bgcolor=#fefefe
| 486228 ||  || — || September 4, 2007 || Mount Lemmon || Mount Lemmon Survey || — || align=right data-sort-value="0.79" | 790 m || 
|-id=229 bgcolor=#E9E9E9
| 486229 ||  || — || February 19, 2009 || Mount Lemmon || Mount Lemmon Survey || — || align=right | 1.3 km || 
|-id=230 bgcolor=#fefefe
| 486230 ||  || — || December 1, 2008 || Kitt Peak || Spacewatch || — || align=right data-sort-value="0.71" | 710 m || 
|-id=231 bgcolor=#fefefe
| 486231 ||  || — || March 2, 2006 || Kitt Peak || Spacewatch || — || align=right data-sort-value="0.75" | 750 m || 
|-id=232 bgcolor=#E9E9E9
| 486232 ||  || — || November 12, 2012 || Mount Lemmon || Mount Lemmon Survey || MAR || align=right data-sort-value="0.95" | 950 m || 
|-id=233 bgcolor=#E9E9E9
| 486233 ||  || — || January 16, 2013 || Mount Lemmon || Mount Lemmon Survey || — || align=right | 1.7 km || 
|-id=234 bgcolor=#E9E9E9
| 486234 ||  || — || July 25, 2011 || Haleakala || Pan-STARRS || — || align=right data-sort-value="0.83" | 830 m || 
|-id=235 bgcolor=#E9E9E9
| 486235 ||  || — || December 23, 2012 || Haleakala || Pan-STARRS || — || align=right | 1.2 km || 
|-id=236 bgcolor=#fefefe
| 486236 ||  || — || July 26, 2011 || Haleakala || Pan-STARRS || — || align=right data-sort-value="0.81" | 810 m || 
|-id=237 bgcolor=#fefefe
| 486237 ||  || — || December 29, 2008 || Kitt Peak || Spacewatch || — || align=right data-sort-value="0.87" | 870 m || 
|-id=238 bgcolor=#fefefe
| 486238 ||  || — || January 17, 2013 || Haleakala || Pan-STARRS || — || align=right data-sort-value="0.78" | 780 m || 
|-id=239 bgcolor=#E9E9E9
| 486239 Zosiakaczmarek ||  ||  || December 13, 2012 || Tincana || M. Kusiak, M. Żołnowski || — || align=right | 2.0 km || 
|-id=240 bgcolor=#E9E9E9
| 486240 ||  || — || February 1, 2005 || Kitt Peak || Spacewatch || — || align=right data-sort-value="0.52" | 520 m || 
|-id=241 bgcolor=#fefefe
| 486241 ||  || — || November 17, 2000 || Kitt Peak || Spacewatch || — || align=right data-sort-value="0.86" | 860 m || 
|-id=242 bgcolor=#E9E9E9
| 486242 ||  || — || January 18, 2013 || Mount Lemmon || Mount Lemmon Survey || — || align=right | 1.7 km || 
|-id=243 bgcolor=#fefefe
| 486243 ||  || — || September 22, 2003 || Kitt Peak || Spacewatch || — || align=right data-sort-value="0.97" | 970 m || 
|-id=244 bgcolor=#fefefe
| 486244 ||  || — || July 28, 2011 || Haleakala || Pan-STARRS || — || align=right data-sort-value="0.88" | 880 m || 
|-id=245 bgcolor=#fefefe
| 486245 ||  || — || January 16, 2013 || Haleakala || Pan-STARRS || — || align=right data-sort-value="0.70" | 700 m || 
|-id=246 bgcolor=#fefefe
| 486246 ||  || — || February 15, 2010 || Kitt Peak || Spacewatch || — || align=right | 1.0 km || 
|-id=247 bgcolor=#E9E9E9
| 486247 ||  || — || January 20, 2009 || Kitt Peak || Spacewatch || — || align=right | 1.1 km || 
|-id=248 bgcolor=#E9E9E9
| 486248 ||  || — || January 31, 2009 || Kitt Peak || Spacewatch || — || align=right data-sort-value="0.82" | 820 m || 
|-id=249 bgcolor=#fefefe
| 486249 ||  || — || January 17, 2013 || Haleakala || Pan-STARRS || NYS || align=right data-sort-value="0.58" | 580 m || 
|-id=250 bgcolor=#fefefe
| 486250 ||  || — || July 22, 2011 || Haleakala || Pan-STARRS || — || align=right data-sort-value="0.70" | 700 m || 
|-id=251 bgcolor=#E9E9E9
| 486251 ||  || — || January 16, 2009 || Kitt Peak || Spacewatch || (5) || align=right data-sort-value="0.73" | 730 m || 
|-id=252 bgcolor=#fefefe
| 486252 ||  || — || February 7, 2002 || Socorro || LINEAR || — || align=right data-sort-value="0.87" | 870 m || 
|-id=253 bgcolor=#fefefe
| 486253 ||  || — || January 10, 2013 || Haleakala || Pan-STARRS || NYS || align=right data-sort-value="0.64" | 640 m || 
|-id=254 bgcolor=#E9E9E9
| 486254 ||  || — || October 19, 2011 || Haleakala || Pan-STARRS || — || align=right | 1.9 km || 
|-id=255 bgcolor=#fefefe
| 486255 ||  || — || January 16, 2013 || Haleakala || Pan-STARRS || — || align=right data-sort-value="0.80" | 800 m || 
|-id=256 bgcolor=#fefefe
| 486256 ||  || — || February 7, 2002 || Kitt Peak || Spacewatch || — || align=right data-sort-value="0.61" | 610 m || 
|-id=257 bgcolor=#fefefe
| 486257 ||  || — || January 18, 2013 || Haleakala || Pan-STARRS || — || align=right | 1.0 km || 
|-id=258 bgcolor=#E9E9E9
| 486258 ||  || — || February 2, 2009 || Kitt Peak || Spacewatch || — || align=right data-sort-value="0.94" | 940 m || 
|-id=259 bgcolor=#fefefe
| 486259 ||  || — || January 23, 1998 || Kitt Peak || Spacewatch || — || align=right data-sort-value="0.87" | 870 m || 
|-id=260 bgcolor=#fefefe
| 486260 ||  || — || August 21, 2011 || Haleakala || Pan-STARRS || — || align=right data-sort-value="0.91" | 910 m || 
|-id=261 bgcolor=#E9E9E9
| 486261 ||  || — || January 10, 2013 || Haleakala || Pan-STARRS || — || align=right | 1.2 km || 
|-id=262 bgcolor=#fefefe
| 486262 ||  || — || March 25, 2006 || Kitt Peak || Spacewatch || NYS || align=right data-sort-value="0.54" | 540 m || 
|-id=263 bgcolor=#E9E9E9
| 486263 ||  || — || September 20, 2011 || La Sagra || OAM Obs. || — || align=right | 1.8 km || 
|-id=264 bgcolor=#E9E9E9
| 486264 ||  || — || February 1, 2005 || Kitt Peak || Spacewatch || — || align=right data-sort-value="0.88" | 880 m || 
|-id=265 bgcolor=#E9E9E9
| 486265 ||  || — || January 28, 2009 || Catalina || CSS || — || align=right | 1.5 km || 
|-id=266 bgcolor=#E9E9E9
| 486266 ||  || — || September 10, 2007 || Mount Lemmon || Mount Lemmon Survey || (5) || align=right data-sort-value="0.63" | 630 m || 
|-id=267 bgcolor=#E9E9E9
| 486267 ||  || — || February 9, 2005 || Kitt Peak || Spacewatch || — || align=right data-sort-value="0.72" | 720 m || 
|-id=268 bgcolor=#E9E9E9
| 486268 ||  || — || December 23, 2012 || Mount Lemmon || Mount Lemmon Survey || — || align=right | 2.1 km || 
|-id=269 bgcolor=#E9E9E9
| 486269 ||  || — || October 30, 2007 || Kitt Peak || Spacewatch || — || align=right data-sort-value="0.87" | 870 m || 
|-id=270 bgcolor=#E9E9E9
| 486270 ||  || — || October 9, 2007 || Mount Lemmon || Mount Lemmon Survey || — || align=right data-sort-value="0.70" | 700 m || 
|-id=271 bgcolor=#fefefe
| 486271 ||  || — || December 23, 2012 || Haleakala || Pan-STARRS || — || align=right data-sort-value="0.79" | 790 m || 
|-id=272 bgcolor=#E9E9E9
| 486272 ||  || — || December 8, 2012 || Mount Lemmon || Mount Lemmon Survey || — || align=right data-sort-value="0.98" | 980 m || 
|-id=273 bgcolor=#d6d6d6
| 486273 ||  || — || February 5, 2013 || Kitt Peak || Spacewatch || — || align=right | 3.2 km || 
|-id=274 bgcolor=#fefefe
| 486274 ||  || — || February 1, 2013 || Nogales || Tenagra II Obs. || — || align=right | 1.0 km || 
|-id=275 bgcolor=#E9E9E9
| 486275 ||  || — || December 4, 1999 || Kitt Peak || Spacewatch || JUN || align=right | 1.1 km || 
|-id=276 bgcolor=#E9E9E9
| 486276 ||  || — || September 20, 2011 || Haleakala || Pan-STARRS || — || align=right | 2.1 km || 
|-id=277 bgcolor=#E9E9E9
| 486277 ||  || — || February 4, 2009 || Mount Lemmon || Mount Lemmon Survey || — || align=right | 1.1 km || 
|-id=278 bgcolor=#fefefe
| 486278 ||  || — || July 1, 2011 || Mount Lemmon || Mount Lemmon Survey || — || align=right data-sort-value="0.83" | 830 m || 
|-id=279 bgcolor=#E9E9E9
| 486279 ||  || — || October 16, 2003 || Kitt Peak || Spacewatch || — || align=right data-sort-value="0.62" | 620 m || 
|-id=280 bgcolor=#E9E9E9
| 486280 ||  || — || February 5, 2013 || Kitt Peak || Spacewatch || — || align=right | 1.2 km || 
|-id=281 bgcolor=#E9E9E9
| 486281 ||  || — || August 20, 2011 || Haleakala || Pan-STARRS || — || align=right | 1.2 km || 
|-id=282 bgcolor=#fefefe
| 486282 ||  || — || November 4, 2007 || Mount Lemmon || Mount Lemmon Survey || — || align=right data-sort-value="0.85" | 850 m || 
|-id=283 bgcolor=#E9E9E9
| 486283 ||  || — || February 1, 2009 || Kitt Peak || Spacewatch || — || align=right data-sort-value="0.76" | 760 m || 
|-id=284 bgcolor=#fefefe
| 486284 ||  || — || October 5, 2007 || Kitt Peak || Spacewatch || V || align=right data-sort-value="0.74" | 740 m || 
|-id=285 bgcolor=#fefefe
| 486285 ||  || — || September 23, 2011 || Haleakala || Pan-STARRS || V || align=right data-sort-value="0.82" | 820 m || 
|-id=286 bgcolor=#E9E9E9
| 486286 ||  || — || November 3, 1999 || Kitt Peak || Spacewatch || (5) || align=right data-sort-value="0.60" | 600 m || 
|-id=287 bgcolor=#E9E9E9
| 486287 ||  || — || October 24, 2011 || Haleakala || Pan-STARRS || — || align=right | 1.8 km || 
|-id=288 bgcolor=#E9E9E9
| 486288 ||  || — || January 8, 2013 || Mount Lemmon || Mount Lemmon Survey || MAR || align=right data-sort-value="0.91" | 910 m || 
|-id=289 bgcolor=#E9E9E9
| 486289 ||  || — || December 31, 2008 || Mount Lemmon || Mount Lemmon Survey || — || align=right data-sort-value="0.80" | 800 m || 
|-id=290 bgcolor=#E9E9E9
| 486290 ||  || — || September 25, 2011 || Haleakala || Pan-STARRS || — || align=right | 1.9 km || 
|-id=291 bgcolor=#E9E9E9
| 486291 ||  || — || September 4, 2011 || Haleakala || Pan-STARRS || — || align=right | 1.5 km || 
|-id=292 bgcolor=#fefefe
| 486292 ||  || — || January 2, 2009 || Mount Lemmon || Mount Lemmon Survey || — || align=right data-sort-value="0.86" | 860 m || 
|-id=293 bgcolor=#E9E9E9
| 486293 ||  || — || October 11, 2007 || Kitt Peak || Spacewatch || — || align=right | 1.3 km || 
|-id=294 bgcolor=#fefefe
| 486294 ||  || — || January 10, 2013 || Kitt Peak || Spacewatch || — || align=right data-sort-value="0.77" | 770 m || 
|-id=295 bgcolor=#E9E9E9
| 486295 ||  || — || January 31, 2009 || Kitt Peak || Spacewatch || — || align=right data-sort-value="0.78" | 780 m || 
|-id=296 bgcolor=#fefefe
| 486296 ||  || — || February 5, 2013 || Catalina || CSS || — || align=right data-sort-value="0.86" | 860 m || 
|-id=297 bgcolor=#E9E9E9
| 486297 ||  || — || March 3, 2009 || Kitt Peak || Spacewatch || — || align=right data-sort-value="0.78" | 780 m || 
|-id=298 bgcolor=#fefefe
| 486298 ||  || — || December 4, 2008 || Kitt Peak || Spacewatch || — || align=right data-sort-value="0.75" | 750 m || 
|-id=299 bgcolor=#E9E9E9
| 486299 ||  || — || January 17, 2013 || Mount Lemmon || Mount Lemmon Survey || — || align=right | 1.3 km || 
|-id=300 bgcolor=#E9E9E9
| 486300 ||  || — || March 29, 2009 || Catalina || CSS || — || align=right | 1.8 km || 
|}

486301–486400 

|-bgcolor=#fefefe
| 486301 ||  || — || February 8, 2013 || Haleakala || Pan-STARRS || — || align=right data-sort-value="0.92" | 920 m || 
|-id=302 bgcolor=#E9E9E9
| 486302 ||  || — || February 8, 2013 || Haleakala || Pan-STARRS || — || align=right | 1.3 km || 
|-id=303 bgcolor=#E9E9E9
| 486303 ||  || — || August 2, 2010 || La Sagra || OAM Obs. || — || align=right | 1.1 km || 
|-id=304 bgcolor=#E9E9E9
| 486304 ||  || — || May 1, 2010 || WISE || WISE || — || align=right | 2.2 km || 
|-id=305 bgcolor=#E9E9E9
| 486305 ||  || — || April 22, 2009 || Mount Lemmon || Mount Lemmon Survey || — || align=right | 1.4 km || 
|-id=306 bgcolor=#fefefe
| 486306 ||  || — || January 17, 2009 || La Sagra || OAM Obs. || — || align=right | 1.0 km || 
|-id=307 bgcolor=#fefefe
| 486307 ||  || — || February 8, 2013 || Haleakala || Pan-STARRS || — || align=right data-sort-value="0.79" | 790 m || 
|-id=308 bgcolor=#E9E9E9
| 486308 ||  || — || January 17, 2013 || Kitt Peak || Spacewatch || — || align=right | 2.0 km || 
|-id=309 bgcolor=#E9E9E9
| 486309 ||  || — || January 17, 2013 || Mount Lemmon || Mount Lemmon Survey || — || align=right | 1.6 km || 
|-id=310 bgcolor=#E9E9E9
| 486310 ||  || — || February 8, 2013 || Haleakala || Pan-STARRS || EUN || align=right | 1.00 km || 
|-id=311 bgcolor=#E9E9E9
| 486311 ||  || — || October 25, 2011 || Haleakala || Pan-STARRS || — || align=right | 1.7 km || 
|-id=312 bgcolor=#d6d6d6
| 486312 ||  || — || February 9, 2013 || Haleakala || Pan-STARRS || EOS || align=right | 1.9 km || 
|-id=313 bgcolor=#E9E9E9
| 486313 ||  || — || November 24, 2011 || Haleakala || Pan-STARRS || — || align=right | 1.5 km || 
|-id=314 bgcolor=#E9E9E9
| 486314 ||  || — || January 20, 2013 || Kitt Peak || Spacewatch || (5) || align=right data-sort-value="0.90" | 900 m || 
|-id=315 bgcolor=#fefefe
| 486315 ||  || — || November 2, 2007 || Mount Lemmon || Mount Lemmon Survey || — || align=right data-sort-value="0.79" | 790 m || 
|-id=316 bgcolor=#fefefe
| 486316 ||  || — || August 28, 2011 || Haleakala || Pan-STARRS || — || align=right data-sort-value="0.92" | 920 m || 
|-id=317 bgcolor=#E9E9E9
| 486317 ||  || — || September 21, 2003 || Kitt Peak || Spacewatch || RAF || align=right data-sort-value="0.72" | 720 m || 
|-id=318 bgcolor=#fefefe
| 486318 ||  || — || August 24, 2011 || La Sagra || OAM Obs. || — || align=right data-sort-value="0.96" | 960 m || 
|-id=319 bgcolor=#fefefe
| 486319 ||  || — || April 2, 2006 || Kitt Peak || Spacewatch || — || align=right | 1.0 km || 
|-id=320 bgcolor=#fefefe
| 486320 ||  || — || October 9, 2004 || Kitt Peak || Spacewatch || MAS || align=right data-sort-value="0.64" | 640 m || 
|-id=321 bgcolor=#E9E9E9
| 486321 ||  || — || February 19, 2009 || Mount Lemmon || Mount Lemmon Survey || BRG || align=right | 1.1 km || 
|-id=322 bgcolor=#fefefe
| 486322 ||  || — || December 31, 2008 || Catalina || CSS || — || align=right data-sort-value="0.90" | 900 m || 
|-id=323 bgcolor=#E9E9E9
| 486323 ||  || — || October 31, 2007 || Mount Lemmon || Mount Lemmon Survey || KON || align=right | 1.9 km || 
|-id=324 bgcolor=#E9E9E9
| 486324 ||  || — || June 27, 2005 || Kitt Peak || Spacewatch || — || align=right | 1.8 km || 
|-id=325 bgcolor=#E9E9E9
| 486325 ||  || — || October 26, 2011 || Haleakala || Pan-STARRS || — || align=right | 1.8 km || 
|-id=326 bgcolor=#E9E9E9
| 486326 ||  || — || February 6, 2013 || Kitt Peak || Spacewatch || — || align=right | 1.1 km || 
|-id=327 bgcolor=#E9E9E9
| 486327 ||  || — || October 11, 2007 || Mount Lemmon || Mount Lemmon Survey || (5) || align=right data-sort-value="0.63" | 630 m || 
|-id=328 bgcolor=#E9E9E9
| 486328 ||  || — || December 30, 2008 || Mount Lemmon || Mount Lemmon Survey || — || align=right | 1.3 km || 
|-id=329 bgcolor=#E9E9E9
| 486329 ||  || — || September 8, 2011 || Haleakala || Pan-STARRS || — || align=right | 1.5 km || 
|-id=330 bgcolor=#E9E9E9
| 486330 ||  || — || February 26, 2009 || Kitt Peak || Spacewatch || — || align=right | 1.1 km || 
|-id=331 bgcolor=#E9E9E9
| 486331 ||  || — || March 1, 2009 || Kitt Peak || Spacewatch || — || align=right data-sort-value="0.74" | 740 m || 
|-id=332 bgcolor=#E9E9E9
| 486332 ||  || — || March 1, 2009 || Mount Lemmon || Mount Lemmon Survey || — || align=right | 1.4 km || 
|-id=333 bgcolor=#E9E9E9
| 486333 ||  || — || January 17, 2009 || Kitt Peak || Spacewatch || — || align=right | 1.2 km || 
|-id=334 bgcolor=#E9E9E9
| 486334 ||  || — || February 26, 2009 || Kitt Peak || Spacewatch || — || align=right | 1.7 km || 
|-id=335 bgcolor=#E9E9E9
| 486335 ||  || — || February 14, 2013 || Haleakala || Pan-STARRS || — || align=right data-sort-value="0.82" | 820 m || 
|-id=336 bgcolor=#E9E9E9
| 486336 ||  || — || November 13, 2007 || Mount Lemmon || Mount Lemmon Survey || — || align=right | 1.3 km || 
|-id=337 bgcolor=#E9E9E9
| 486337 ||  || — || February 26, 2009 || Kitt Peak || Spacewatch || — || align=right data-sort-value="0.73" | 730 m || 
|-id=338 bgcolor=#E9E9E9
| 486338 ||  || — || February 27, 2009 || Kitt Peak || Spacewatch || — || align=right data-sort-value="0.81" | 810 m || 
|-id=339 bgcolor=#E9E9E9
| 486339 ||  || — || September 15, 2006 || Kitt Peak || Spacewatch || — || align=right | 1.3 km || 
|-id=340 bgcolor=#E9E9E9
| 486340 ||  || — || February 14, 2013 || Kitt Peak || Spacewatch || — || align=right | 1.5 km || 
|-id=341 bgcolor=#E9E9E9
| 486341 ||  || — || February 14, 2013 || Haleakala || Pan-STARRS || — || align=right data-sort-value="0.98" | 980 m || 
|-id=342 bgcolor=#fefefe
| 486342 ||  || — || January 9, 2013 || Mount Lemmon || Mount Lemmon Survey || — || align=right data-sort-value="0.86" | 860 m || 
|-id=343 bgcolor=#d6d6d6
| 486343 ||  || — || October 26, 2011 || Haleakala || Pan-STARRS || — || align=right | 2.0 km || 
|-id=344 bgcolor=#E9E9E9
| 486344 ||  || — || January 20, 2009 || Mount Lemmon || Mount Lemmon Survey || — || align=right | 1.1 km || 
|-id=345 bgcolor=#E9E9E9
| 486345 ||  || — || January 19, 2013 || Mount Lemmon || Mount Lemmon Survey || — || align=right data-sort-value="0.96" | 960 m || 
|-id=346 bgcolor=#E9E9E9
| 486346 ||  || — || February 15, 2013 || Haleakala || Pan-STARRS || (5) || align=right data-sort-value="0.64" | 640 m || 
|-id=347 bgcolor=#E9E9E9
| 486347 ||  || — || February 15, 2013 || Haleakala || Pan-STARRS || — || align=right data-sort-value="0.96" | 960 m || 
|-id=348 bgcolor=#E9E9E9
| 486348 ||  || — || March 4, 2005 || Kitt Peak || Spacewatch || — || align=right data-sort-value="0.68" | 680 m || 
|-id=349 bgcolor=#E9E9E9
| 486349 ||  || — || December 8, 2012 || Mount Lemmon || Mount Lemmon Survey || — || align=right data-sort-value="0.93" | 930 m || 
|-id=350 bgcolor=#E9E9E9
| 486350 ||  || — || August 31, 2011 || Haleakala || Pan-STARRS || KON || align=right | 2.6 km || 
|-id=351 bgcolor=#E9E9E9
| 486351 ||  || — || October 24, 2011 || Haleakala || Pan-STARRS || — || align=right | 1.1 km || 
|-id=352 bgcolor=#E9E9E9
| 486352 ||  || — || February 13, 2013 || Haleakala || Pan-STARRS || — || align=right data-sort-value="0.87" | 870 m || 
|-id=353 bgcolor=#E9E9E9
| 486353 ||  || — || September 4, 2011 || Haleakala || Pan-STARRS || BRG || align=right | 1.5 km || 
|-id=354 bgcolor=#E9E9E9
| 486354 ||  || — || September 27, 2011 || Mount Lemmon || Mount Lemmon Survey || — || align=right | 1.0 km || 
|-id=355 bgcolor=#E9E9E9
| 486355 ||  || — || September 7, 2011 || Kitt Peak || Spacewatch || — || align=right | 1.1 km || 
|-id=356 bgcolor=#fefefe
| 486356 ||  || — || January 30, 2009 || Mount Lemmon || Mount Lemmon Survey || — || align=right data-sort-value="0.62" | 620 m || 
|-id=357 bgcolor=#E9E9E9
| 486357 ||  || — || February 4, 2009 || Mount Lemmon || Mount Lemmon Survey || MAR || align=right data-sort-value="0.88" | 880 m || 
|-id=358 bgcolor=#d6d6d6
| 486358 ||  || — || February 5, 2013 || Kitt Peak || Spacewatch || — || align=right | 2.3 km || 
|-id=359 bgcolor=#E9E9E9
| 486359 ||  || — || March 3, 2005 || Kitt Peak || Spacewatch || — || align=right data-sort-value="0.87" | 870 m || 
|-id=360 bgcolor=#E9E9E9
| 486360 ||  || — || January 4, 2013 || Kitt Peak || Spacewatch || — || align=right | 1.4 km || 
|-id=361 bgcolor=#fefefe
| 486361 ||  || — || February 5, 2013 || Kitt Peak || Spacewatch || MAS || align=right data-sort-value="0.70" | 700 m || 
|-id=362 bgcolor=#E9E9E9
| 486362 ||  || — || February 8, 2013 || Haleakala || Pan-STARRS || — || align=right data-sort-value="0.62" | 620 m || 
|-id=363 bgcolor=#fefefe
| 486363 ||  || — || February 8, 2013 || Haleakala || Pan-STARRS || — || align=right data-sort-value="0.71" | 710 m || 
|-id=364 bgcolor=#E9E9E9
| 486364 ||  || — || January 10, 2013 || Mount Lemmon || Mount Lemmon Survey || MAR || align=right data-sort-value="0.85" | 850 m || 
|-id=365 bgcolor=#E9E9E9
| 486365 ||  || — || February 9, 2013 || Haleakala || Pan-STARRS || — || align=right | 1.2 km || 
|-id=366 bgcolor=#E9E9E9
| 486366 ||  || — || February 28, 2009 || Kitt Peak || Spacewatch || (5) || align=right data-sort-value="0.56" | 560 m || 
|-id=367 bgcolor=#E9E9E9
| 486367 ||  || — || March 3, 2009 || Kitt Peak || Spacewatch || — || align=right | 1.3 km || 
|-id=368 bgcolor=#E9E9E9
| 486368 ||  || — || January 17, 2013 || Mount Lemmon || Mount Lemmon Survey || WIT || align=right data-sort-value="0.90" | 900 m || 
|-id=369 bgcolor=#E9E9E9
| 486369 ||  || — || October 25, 2011 || Haleakala || Pan-STARRS || — || align=right | 1.6 km || 
|-id=370 bgcolor=#fefefe
| 486370 ||  || — || February 7, 2013 || Kitt Peak || Spacewatch || — || align=right data-sort-value="0.85" | 850 m || 
|-id=371 bgcolor=#E9E9E9
| 486371 ||  || — || March 11, 2005 || Mount Lemmon || Mount Lemmon Survey || — || align=right data-sort-value="0.56" | 560 m || 
|-id=372 bgcolor=#E9E9E9
| 486372 ||  || — || September 26, 2006 || Kitt Peak || Spacewatch || — || align=right | 1.9 km || 
|-id=373 bgcolor=#E9E9E9
| 486373 ||  || — || February 15, 2013 || Haleakala || Pan-STARRS || — || align=right data-sort-value="0.85" | 850 m || 
|-id=374 bgcolor=#E9E9E9
| 486374 ||  || — || February 15, 2013 || Haleakala || Pan-STARRS || WIT || align=right data-sort-value="0.82" | 820 m || 
|-id=375 bgcolor=#E9E9E9
| 486375 ||  || — || April 9, 2005 || Mount Lemmon || Mount Lemmon Survey || — || align=right data-sort-value="0.80" | 800 m || 
|-id=376 bgcolor=#E9E9E9
| 486376 ||  || — || November 18, 2011 || Mount Lemmon || Mount Lemmon Survey || — || align=right | 1.3 km || 
|-id=377 bgcolor=#E9E9E9
| 486377 ||  || — || September 20, 2011 || Haleakala || Pan-STARRS || — || align=right | 2.1 km || 
|-id=378 bgcolor=#E9E9E9
| 486378 ||  || — || February 4, 2009 || Mount Lemmon || Mount Lemmon Survey || — || align=right data-sort-value="0.65" | 650 m || 
|-id=379 bgcolor=#E9E9E9
| 486379 ||  || — || March 31, 2009 || Mount Lemmon || Mount Lemmon Survey || — || align=right | 1.3 km || 
|-id=380 bgcolor=#E9E9E9
| 486380 ||  || — || March 18, 2004 || Kitt Peak || Spacewatch || — || align=right | 2.3 km || 
|-id=381 bgcolor=#E9E9E9
| 486381 ||  || — || March 5, 2013 || Catalina || CSS || — || align=right | 1.5 km || 
|-id=382 bgcolor=#E9E9E9
| 486382 ||  || — || January 22, 2013 || Kitt Peak || Spacewatch || — || align=right | 1.5 km || 
|-id=383 bgcolor=#E9E9E9
| 486383 ||  || — || February 18, 2013 || Kitt Peak || Spacewatch || — || align=right | 1.4 km || 
|-id=384 bgcolor=#E9E9E9
| 486384 ||  || — || September 15, 2007 || Mount Lemmon || Mount Lemmon Survey || — || align=right data-sort-value="0.81" | 810 m || 
|-id=385 bgcolor=#d6d6d6
| 486385 ||  || — || December 12, 2006 || Kitt Peak || Spacewatch || KOR || align=right | 1.4 km || 
|-id=386 bgcolor=#E9E9E9
| 486386 ||  || — || March 26, 2009 || Kitt Peak || Spacewatch || — || align=right | 1.2 km || 
|-id=387 bgcolor=#E9E9E9
| 486387 ||  || — || May 8, 2005 || Mount Lemmon || Mount Lemmon Survey || — || align=right | 2.5 km || 
|-id=388 bgcolor=#E9E9E9
| 486388 ||  || — || May 20, 2005 || Mount Lemmon || Mount Lemmon Survey || — || align=right data-sort-value="0.75" | 750 m || 
|-id=389 bgcolor=#d6d6d6
| 486389 ||  || — || January 19, 2002 || Kitt Peak || Spacewatch || — || align=right | 3.3 km || 
|-id=390 bgcolor=#E9E9E9
| 486390 ||  || — || March 25, 2009 || Mount Lemmon || Mount Lemmon Survey || — || align=right | 1.4 km || 
|-id=391 bgcolor=#E9E9E9
| 486391 ||  || — || October 10, 2007 || Mount Lemmon || Mount Lemmon Survey || — || align=right | 1.2 km || 
|-id=392 bgcolor=#E9E9E9
| 486392 ||  || — || January 13, 2008 || Kitt Peak || Spacewatch || — || align=right | 2.2 km || 
|-id=393 bgcolor=#E9E9E9
| 486393 ||  || — || April 19, 2009 || Kitt Peak || Spacewatch || — || align=right | 1.1 km || 
|-id=394 bgcolor=#E9E9E9
| 486394 ||  || — || April 10, 2005 || Mount Lemmon || Mount Lemmon Survey || — || align=right data-sort-value="0.81" | 810 m || 
|-id=395 bgcolor=#E9E9E9
| 486395 ||  || — || February 17, 2013 || Kitt Peak || Spacewatch || — || align=right data-sort-value="0.76" | 760 m || 
|-id=396 bgcolor=#E9E9E9
| 486396 ||  || — || February 17, 2013 || Kitt Peak || Spacewatch || KON || align=right | 1.6 km || 
|-id=397 bgcolor=#E9E9E9
| 486397 ||  || — || November 8, 2007 || Kitt Peak || Spacewatch || — || align=right | 1.4 km || 
|-id=398 bgcolor=#E9E9E9
| 486398 ||  || — || September 21, 2011 || Kitt Peak || Spacewatch || — || align=right | 1.2 km || 
|-id=399 bgcolor=#E9E9E9
| 486399 ||  || — || February 14, 2013 || Kitt Peak || Spacewatch || — || align=right | 1.8 km || 
|-id=400 bgcolor=#E9E9E9
| 486400 ||  || — || October 26, 2011 || Haleakala || Pan-STARRS || — || align=right | 1.2 km || 
|}

486401–486500 

|-bgcolor=#E9E9E9
| 486401 ||  || — || September 20, 2011 || Kitt Peak || Spacewatch || — || align=right | 1.3 km || 
|-id=402 bgcolor=#fefefe
| 486402 ||  || — || February 15, 2013 || Haleakala || Pan-STARRS || — || align=right | 1.00 km || 
|-id=403 bgcolor=#E9E9E9
| 486403 ||  || — || December 16, 2007 || Kitt Peak || Spacewatch || — || align=right | 1.5 km || 
|-id=404 bgcolor=#E9E9E9
| 486404 ||  || — || October 23, 2011 || Haleakala || Pan-STARRS || — || align=right | 1.5 km || 
|-id=405 bgcolor=#E9E9E9
| 486405 ||  || — || March 8, 2013 || Haleakala || Pan-STARRS || — || align=right | 2.2 km || 
|-id=406 bgcolor=#E9E9E9
| 486406 ||  || — || March 8, 2013 || Haleakala || Pan-STARRS || — || align=right | 1.1 km || 
|-id=407 bgcolor=#E9E9E9
| 486407 ||  || — || January 19, 2013 || Kitt Peak || Spacewatch || — || align=right | 1.6 km || 
|-id=408 bgcolor=#E9E9E9
| 486408 ||  || — || February 14, 2013 || Haleakala || Pan-STARRS || — || align=right | 2.0 km || 
|-id=409 bgcolor=#E9E9E9
| 486409 ||  || — || October 12, 2007 || Kitt Peak || Spacewatch || — || align=right | 1.6 km || 
|-id=410 bgcolor=#E9E9E9
| 486410 ||  || — || March 8, 2013 || Haleakala || Pan-STARRS || — || align=right | 2.9 km || 
|-id=411 bgcolor=#E9E9E9
| 486411 ||  || — || April 6, 2005 || Mount Lemmon || Mount Lemmon Survey || — || align=right data-sort-value="0.90" | 900 m || 
|-id=412 bgcolor=#fefefe
| 486412 ||  || — || August 23, 2011 || Haleakala || Pan-STARRS || — || align=right data-sort-value="0.94" | 940 m || 
|-id=413 bgcolor=#E9E9E9
| 486413 ||  || — || March 13, 2013 || Kitt Peak || Spacewatch || — || align=right | 1.5 km || 
|-id=414 bgcolor=#E9E9E9
| 486414 ||  || — || February 7, 2013 || Kitt Peak || Spacewatch || — || align=right | 1.3 km || 
|-id=415 bgcolor=#E9E9E9
| 486415 ||  || — || October 27, 2011 || Mount Lemmon || Mount Lemmon Survey || — || align=right | 1.6 km || 
|-id=416 bgcolor=#E9E9E9
| 486416 Mami ||  ||  || March 13, 2013 || Palomar || PTF || — || align=right | 1.6 km || 
|-id=417 bgcolor=#E9E9E9
| 486417 ||  || — || October 28, 2006 || Kitt Peak || Spacewatch || — || align=right | 2.0 km || 
|-id=418 bgcolor=#E9E9E9
| 486418 ||  || — || March 5, 2013 || Haleakala || Pan-STARRS || — || align=right | 3.1 km || 
|-id=419 bgcolor=#E9E9E9
| 486419 ||  || — || April 27, 2009 || Kitt Peak || Spacewatch || — || align=right | 1.2 km || 
|-id=420 bgcolor=#E9E9E9
| 486420 ||  || — || March 24, 2009 || Mount Lemmon || Mount Lemmon Survey || — || align=right data-sort-value="0.83" | 830 m || 
|-id=421 bgcolor=#E9E9E9
| 486421 ||  || — || March 8, 2013 || Haleakala || Pan-STARRS || — || align=right | 1.4 km || 
|-id=422 bgcolor=#E9E9E9
| 486422 ||  || — || April 18, 2009 || Mount Lemmon || Mount Lemmon Survey || — || align=right | 1.3 km || 
|-id=423 bgcolor=#E9E9E9
| 486423 ||  || — || March 5, 2013 || Kitt Peak || Spacewatch || — || align=right | 2.0 km || 
|-id=424 bgcolor=#E9E9E9
| 486424 ||  || — || January 30, 2009 || Mount Lemmon || Mount Lemmon Survey || — || align=right data-sort-value="0.82" | 820 m || 
|-id=425 bgcolor=#E9E9E9
| 486425 ||  || — || February 7, 2013 || Kitt Peak || Spacewatch || — || align=right data-sort-value="0.81" | 810 m || 
|-id=426 bgcolor=#E9E9E9
| 486426 ||  || — || February 28, 2008 || Mount Lemmon || Mount Lemmon Survey || — || align=right | 2.4 km || 
|-id=427 bgcolor=#E9E9E9
| 486427 ||  || — || July 6, 2010 || Kitt Peak || Spacewatch || — || align=right | 1.7 km || 
|-id=428 bgcolor=#E9E9E9
| 486428 ||  || — || September 21, 2001 || Kitt Peak || Spacewatch || — || align=right | 2.2 km || 
|-id=429 bgcolor=#E9E9E9
| 486429 ||  || — || October 23, 2011 || Mount Lemmon || Mount Lemmon Survey || — || align=right data-sort-value="0.73" | 730 m || 
|-id=430 bgcolor=#E9E9E9
| 486430 ||  || — || February 17, 2013 || Kitt Peak || Spacewatch || — || align=right | 1.9 km || 
|-id=431 bgcolor=#E9E9E9
| 486431 ||  || — || June 19, 2009 || Kitt Peak || Spacewatch || — || align=right | 2.5 km || 
|-id=432 bgcolor=#E9E9E9
| 486432 ||  || — || May 26, 2009 || Kitt Peak || Spacewatch || critical || align=right | 1.2 km || 
|-id=433 bgcolor=#E9E9E9
| 486433 ||  || — || October 12, 2010 || Mount Lemmon || Mount Lemmon Survey || — || align=right | 1.5 km || 
|-id=434 bgcolor=#d6d6d6
| 486434 ||  || — || October 26, 2011 || Haleakala || Pan-STARRS || — || align=right | 2.8 km || 
|-id=435 bgcolor=#E9E9E9
| 486435 ||  || — || May 14, 2009 || Mount Lemmon || Mount Lemmon Survey || — || align=right | 1.3 km || 
|-id=436 bgcolor=#E9E9E9
| 486436 ||  || — || March 19, 2013 || Haleakala || Pan-STARRS || AEO || align=right | 1.2 km || 
|-id=437 bgcolor=#E9E9E9
| 486437 ||  || — || April 17, 2009 || Kitt Peak || Spacewatch || EUN || align=right | 1.1 km || 
|-id=438 bgcolor=#E9E9E9
| 486438 ||  || — || March 5, 2013 || Kitt Peak || Spacewatch || — || align=right | 1.4 km || 
|-id=439 bgcolor=#E9E9E9
| 486439 ||  || — || May 25, 2009 || Mount Lemmon || Mount Lemmon Survey || — || align=right | 1.3 km || 
|-id=440 bgcolor=#E9E9E9
| 486440 ||  || — || March 19, 2013 || Haleakala || Pan-STARRS || — || align=right | 2.4 km || 
|-id=441 bgcolor=#E9E9E9
| 486441 ||  || — || March 13, 2013 || Kitt Peak || Spacewatch || critical || align=right | 1.1 km || 
|-id=442 bgcolor=#E9E9E9
| 486442 ||  || — || October 31, 2010 || Mount Lemmon || Mount Lemmon Survey || — || align=right | 1.7 km || 
|-id=443 bgcolor=#E9E9E9
| 486443 ||  || — || October 25, 2011 || Haleakala || Pan-STARRS || — || align=right data-sort-value="0.98" | 980 m || 
|-id=444 bgcolor=#E9E9E9
| 486444 ||  || — || March 12, 2013 || Mount Lemmon || Mount Lemmon Survey || MIS || align=right | 2.3 km || 
|-id=445 bgcolor=#E9E9E9
| 486445 ||  || — || May 4, 2005 || Kitt Peak || Spacewatch || BRG || align=right | 1.1 km || 
|-id=446 bgcolor=#E9E9E9
| 486446 ||  || — || October 23, 2011 || Haleakala || Pan-STARRS || — || align=right | 1.4 km || 
|-id=447 bgcolor=#E9E9E9
| 486447 ||  || — || January 18, 2008 || Mount Lemmon || Mount Lemmon Survey || DOR || align=right | 2.5 km || 
|-id=448 bgcolor=#E9E9E9
| 486448 ||  || — || March 5, 2013 || Haleakala || Pan-STARRS || EUN || align=right | 1.3 km || 
|-id=449 bgcolor=#E9E9E9
| 486449 ||  || — || March 4, 2013 || Haleakala || Pan-STARRS || — || align=right | 1.6 km || 
|-id=450 bgcolor=#E9E9E9
| 486450 ||  || — || April 16, 2004 || Kitt Peak || Spacewatch || — || align=right | 1.8 km || 
|-id=451 bgcolor=#d6d6d6
| 486451 ||  || — || March 19, 2013 || Haleakala || Pan-STARRS || (1298) || align=right | 2.8 km || 
|-id=452 bgcolor=#fefefe
| 486452 ||  || — || February 26, 2009 || Kitt Peak || Spacewatch || — || align=right | 1.1 km || 
|-id=453 bgcolor=#d6d6d6
| 486453 ||  || — || August 31, 2005 || Kitt Peak || Spacewatch || — || align=right | 2.3 km || 
|-id=454 bgcolor=#E9E9E9
| 486454 ||  || — || April 24, 2000 || Kitt Peak || Spacewatch || critical || align=right | 1.3 km || 
|-id=455 bgcolor=#E9E9E9
| 486455 ||  || — || October 11, 2010 || Mount Lemmon || Mount Lemmon Survey || — || align=right | 1.0 km || 
|-id=456 bgcolor=#E9E9E9
| 486456 ||  || — || March 19, 2013 || Haleakala || Pan-STARRS || — || align=right | 1.5 km || 
|-id=457 bgcolor=#E9E9E9
| 486457 ||  || — || April 4, 2013 || Haleakala || Pan-STARRS || — || align=right | 2.1 km || 
|-id=458 bgcolor=#d6d6d6
| 486458 ||  || — || March 7, 2013 || Kitt Peak || Spacewatch ||  || align=right | 2.4 km || 
|-id=459 bgcolor=#E9E9E9
| 486459 ||  || — || April 18, 2009 || Kitt Peak || Spacewatch || — || align=right | 1.3 km || 
|-id=460 bgcolor=#E9E9E9
| 486460 ||  || — || March 15, 2004 || Kitt Peak || Spacewatch || — || align=right | 1.3 km || 
|-id=461 bgcolor=#E9E9E9
| 486461 ||  || — || November 24, 2011 || Mount Lemmon || Mount Lemmon Survey || EUN || align=right | 1.2 km || 
|-id=462 bgcolor=#E9E9E9
| 486462 ||  || — || February 18, 2013 || Mount Lemmon || Mount Lemmon Survey || — || align=right data-sort-value="0.96" | 960 m || 
|-id=463 bgcolor=#E9E9E9
| 486463 ||  || — || April 7, 2013 || Mount Lemmon || Mount Lemmon Survey || — || align=right | 1.2 km || 
|-id=464 bgcolor=#E9E9E9
| 486464 ||  || — || October 26, 2011 || Haleakala || Pan-STARRS || — || align=right | 1.5 km || 
|-id=465 bgcolor=#E9E9E9
| 486465 ||  || — || October 1, 2010 || Mount Lemmon || Mount Lemmon Survey || — || align=right | 1.2 km || 
|-id=466 bgcolor=#E9E9E9
| 486466 ||  || — || March 14, 2013 || Kitt Peak || Spacewatch || — || align=right | 1.7 km || 
|-id=467 bgcolor=#E9E9E9
| 486467 ||  || — || November 25, 2011 || Haleakala || Pan-STARRS || — || align=right | 1.4 km || 
|-id=468 bgcolor=#E9E9E9
| 486468 ||  || — || October 1, 2010 || Mount Lemmon || Mount Lemmon Survey || EUN || align=right data-sort-value="0.99" | 990 m || 
|-id=469 bgcolor=#E9E9E9
| 486469 ||  || — || June 17, 1996 || Kitt Peak || Spacewatch || — || align=right | 1.1 km || 
|-id=470 bgcolor=#E9E9E9
| 486470 ||  || — || April 10, 2013 || Mount Lemmon || Mount Lemmon Survey || — || align=right | 2.2 km || 
|-id=471 bgcolor=#E9E9E9
| 486471 ||  || — || October 28, 2011 || Mount Lemmon || Mount Lemmon Survey || — || align=right | 1.4 km || 
|-id=472 bgcolor=#E9E9E9
| 486472 ||  || — || March 19, 2013 || Haleakala || Pan-STARRS || — || align=right | 2.0 km || 
|-id=473 bgcolor=#E9E9E9
| 486473 ||  || — || April 18, 2009 || Mount Lemmon || Mount Lemmon Survey || — || align=right data-sort-value="0.74" | 740 m || 
|-id=474 bgcolor=#E9E9E9
| 486474 ||  || — || March 21, 2009 || Kitt Peak || Spacewatch || — || align=right data-sort-value="0.75" | 750 m || 
|-id=475 bgcolor=#E9E9E9
| 486475 ||  || — || October 26, 2011 || Haleakala || Pan-STARRS || EUN || align=right | 1.2 km || 
|-id=476 bgcolor=#E9E9E9
| 486476 ||  || — || March 11, 2013 || Catalina || CSS || JUN || align=right | 1.1 km || 
|-id=477 bgcolor=#E9E9E9
| 486477 ||  || — || March 5, 2013 || Kitt Peak || Spacewatch || — || align=right | 1.5 km || 
|-id=478 bgcolor=#E9E9E9
| 486478 ||  || — || April 24, 2004 || Kitt Peak || Spacewatch || — || align=right | 1.8 km || 
|-id=479 bgcolor=#E9E9E9
| 486479 ||  || — || November 25, 2011 || Haleakala || Pan-STARRS || — || align=right | 1.1 km || 
|-id=480 bgcolor=#E9E9E9
| 486480 ||  || — || March 31, 2009 || Mount Lemmon || Mount Lemmon Survey || (5) || align=right data-sort-value="0.60" | 600 m || 
|-id=481 bgcolor=#E9E9E9
| 486481 ||  || — || April 14, 2004 || Kitt Peak || Spacewatch || JUN || align=right | 1.2 km || 
|-id=482 bgcolor=#E9E9E9
| 486482 ||  || — || September 15, 2010 || Mount Lemmon || Mount Lemmon Survey || — || align=right | 1.6 km || 
|-id=483 bgcolor=#E9E9E9
| 486483 ||  || — || March 6, 2008 || Mount Lemmon || Mount Lemmon Survey ||  || align=right | 2.2 km || 
|-id=484 bgcolor=#E9E9E9
| 486484 ||  || — || November 24, 2011 || Haleakala || Pan-STARRS || JUN || align=right | 1.1 km || 
|-id=485 bgcolor=#E9E9E9
| 486485 ||  || — || December 18, 2007 || Mount Lemmon || Mount Lemmon Survey || — || align=right | 2.2 km || 
|-id=486 bgcolor=#d6d6d6
| 486486 ||  || — || April 13, 2013 || Mount Lemmon || Mount Lemmon Survey || — || align=right | 3.0 km || 
|-id=487 bgcolor=#E9E9E9
| 486487 ||  || — || January 17, 2013 || Haleakala || Pan-STARRS || — || align=right | 2.2 km || 
|-id=488 bgcolor=#E9E9E9
| 486488 ||  || — || February 5, 2013 || Mount Lemmon || Mount Lemmon Survey || EUN || align=right | 1.3 km || 
|-id=489 bgcolor=#E9E9E9
| 486489 ||  || — || November 25, 2011 || Haleakala || Pan-STARRS || EUN || align=right | 1.8 km || 
|-id=490 bgcolor=#E9E9E9
| 486490 ||  || — || March 13, 2013 || Haleakala || Pan-STARRS || — || align=right | 2.1 km || 
|-id=491 bgcolor=#E9E9E9
| 486491 ||  || — || March 7, 2013 || Kitt Peak || Spacewatch || — || align=right | 1.3 km || 
|-id=492 bgcolor=#E9E9E9
| 486492 ||  || — || December 22, 2012 || Haleakala || Pan-STARRS || EUN || align=right | 1.3 km || 
|-id=493 bgcolor=#E9E9E9
| 486493 ||  || — || February 13, 2013 || ESA OGS || ESA OGS || EUN || align=right | 1.2 km || 
|-id=494 bgcolor=#E9E9E9
| 486494 ||  || — || April 30, 2009 || Mount Lemmon || Mount Lemmon Survey || — || align=right data-sort-value="0.88" | 880 m || 
|-id=495 bgcolor=#E9E9E9
| 486495 ||  || — || April 2, 2013 || Haleakala || Pan-STARRS || — || align=right | 2.7 km || 
|-id=496 bgcolor=#E9E9E9
| 486496 ||  || — || March 18, 2013 || Kitt Peak || Spacewatch || EUN || align=right | 1.0 km || 
|-id=497 bgcolor=#E9E9E9
| 486497 ||  || — || March 18, 2013 || Kitt Peak || Spacewatch || — || align=right | 1.8 km || 
|-id=498 bgcolor=#E9E9E9
| 486498 ||  || — || March 14, 2013 || Kitt Peak || Spacewatch || — || align=right | 1.9 km || 
|-id=499 bgcolor=#E9E9E9
| 486499 ||  || — || July 31, 2009 || Siding Spring || SSS || — || align=right | 2.6 km || 
|-id=500 bgcolor=#E9E9E9
| 486500 ||  || — || March 16, 2013 || Mount Lemmon || Mount Lemmon Survey || — || align=right | 1.8 km || 
|}

486501–486600 

|-bgcolor=#E9E9E9
| 486501 ||  || — || April 13, 2013 || Haleakala || Pan-STARRS || — || align=right | 1.4 km || 
|-id=502 bgcolor=#E9E9E9
| 486502 ||  || — || November 3, 2010 || Kitt Peak || Spacewatch || — || align=right | 2.5 km || 
|-id=503 bgcolor=#E9E9E9
| 486503 ||  || — || April 20, 2009 || Mount Lemmon || Mount Lemmon Survey || — || align=right data-sort-value="0.89" | 890 m || 
|-id=504 bgcolor=#E9E9E9
| 486504 ||  || — || December 5, 2007 || Kitt Peak || Spacewatch || — || align=right data-sort-value="0.80" | 800 m || 
|-id=505 bgcolor=#E9E9E9
| 486505 ||  || — || January 31, 2009 || Mount Lemmon || Mount Lemmon Survey || — || align=right | 1.2 km || 
|-id=506 bgcolor=#E9E9E9
| 486506 ||  || — || September 10, 2010 || Kitt Peak || Spacewatch || — || align=right | 1.00 km || 
|-id=507 bgcolor=#E9E9E9
| 486507 ||  || — || January 17, 2013 || Haleakala || Pan-STARRS || DOR || align=right | 2.5 km || 
|-id=508 bgcolor=#E9E9E9
| 486508 ||  || — || April 11, 2013 || Mount Lemmon || Mount Lemmon Survey || MAR || align=right | 1.1 km || 
|-id=509 bgcolor=#E9E9E9
| 486509 ||  || — || April 9, 2013 || Haleakala || Pan-STARRS || DOR || align=right | 2.5 km || 
|-id=510 bgcolor=#d6d6d6
| 486510 ||  || — || July 12, 2010 || WISE || WISE || — || align=right | 3.7 km || 
|-id=511 bgcolor=#E9E9E9
| 486511 ||  || — || April 2, 2005 || Kitt Peak || Spacewatch || RAF || align=right data-sort-value="0.91" | 910 m || 
|-id=512 bgcolor=#E9E9E9
| 486512 ||  || — || November 20, 2006 || Kitt Peak || Spacewatch || AST || align=right | 1.5 km || 
|-id=513 bgcolor=#E9E9E9
| 486513 ||  || — || February 26, 2008 || Mount Lemmon || Mount Lemmon Survey || — || align=right | 1.9 km || 
|-id=514 bgcolor=#E9E9E9
| 486514 ||  || — || November 28, 1994 || Kitt Peak || Spacewatch || — || align=right | 1.0 km || 
|-id=515 bgcolor=#d6d6d6
| 486515 ||  || — || April 10, 2013 || Haleakala || Pan-STARRS || EOS || align=right | 2.0 km || 
|-id=516 bgcolor=#E9E9E9
| 486516 ||  || — || March 5, 2013 || Haleakala || Pan-STARRS || — || align=right | 2.7 km || 
|-id=517 bgcolor=#E9E9E9
| 486517 ||  || — || April 10, 2013 || Haleakala || Pan-STARRS || — || align=right | 1.1 km || 
|-id=518 bgcolor=#E9E9E9
| 486518 ||  || — || April 13, 2004 || Kitt Peak || Spacewatch || — || align=right | 1.8 km || 
|-id=519 bgcolor=#d6d6d6
| 486519 ||  || — || April 13, 2013 || Haleakala || Pan-STARRS || NAE || align=right | 2.2 km || 
|-id=520 bgcolor=#E9E9E9
| 486520 ||  || — || October 26, 2011 || Haleakala || Pan-STARRS || — || align=right | 1.6 km || 
|-id=521 bgcolor=#E9E9E9
| 486521 ||  || — || October 13, 2006 || Kitt Peak || Spacewatch || — || align=right | 1.7 km || 
|-id=522 bgcolor=#d6d6d6
| 486522 ||  || — || April 4, 2013 || Haleakala || Pan-STARRS || — || align=right | 2.9 km || 
|-id=523 bgcolor=#E9E9E9
| 486523 ||  || — || April 4, 2013 || Haleakala || Pan-STARRS || — || align=right | 1.3 km || 
|-id=524 bgcolor=#E9E9E9
| 486524 ||  || — || April 20, 2009 || Catalina || CSS || EUN || align=right data-sort-value="0.96" | 960 m || 
|-id=525 bgcolor=#E9E9E9
| 486525 ||  || — || December 29, 2011 || Mount Lemmon || Mount Lemmon Survey || EUN || align=right | 1.1 km || 
|-id=526 bgcolor=#E9E9E9
| 486526 ||  || — || February 11, 2008 || Kitt Peak || Spacewatch ||  || align=right | 2.6 km || 
|-id=527 bgcolor=#FA8072
| 486527 ||  || — || August 2, 2005 || Siding Spring || SSS || — || align=right | 1.5 km || 
|-id=528 bgcolor=#E9E9E9
| 486528 ||  || — || October 13, 2006 || Kitt Peak || Spacewatch || EUN || align=right | 1.2 km || 
|-id=529 bgcolor=#E9E9E9
| 486529 ||  || — || February 7, 2008 || Kitt Peak || Spacewatch || — || align=right | 1.9 km || 
|-id=530 bgcolor=#E9E9E9
| 486530 ||  || — || February 28, 2009 || Mount Lemmon || Mount Lemmon Survey || — || align=right | 3.2 km || 
|-id=531 bgcolor=#E9E9E9
| 486531 ||  || — || April 2, 2009 || Kitt Peak || Spacewatch || — || align=right | 1.3 km || 
|-id=532 bgcolor=#E9E9E9
| 486532 ||  || — || January 13, 2008 || Kitt Peak || Spacewatch || — || align=right | 1.2 km || 
|-id=533 bgcolor=#E9E9E9
| 486533 ||  || — || December 22, 2012 || Haleakala || Pan-STARRS || MAR || align=right | 1.0 km || 
|-id=534 bgcolor=#E9E9E9
| 486534 ||  || — || December 22, 2012 || Haleakala || Pan-STARRS || EUN || align=right | 1.3 km || 
|-id=535 bgcolor=#E9E9E9
| 486535 ||  || — || December 6, 2011 || Haleakala || Pan-STARRS || — || align=right | 1.0 km || 
|-id=536 bgcolor=#E9E9E9
| 486536 ||  || — || October 23, 2011 || Mount Lemmon || Mount Lemmon Survey || — || align=right | 1.2 km || 
|-id=537 bgcolor=#E9E9E9
| 486537 ||  || — || March 16, 2013 || Mount Lemmon || Mount Lemmon Survey || — || align=right | 1.5 km || 
|-id=538 bgcolor=#E9E9E9
| 486538 ||  || — || January 25, 2012 || Haleakala || Pan-STARRS || — || align=right | 2.8 km || 
|-id=539 bgcolor=#E9E9E9
| 486539 ||  || — || March 16, 2013 || Kitt Peak || Spacewatch || — || align=right | 2.2 km || 
|-id=540 bgcolor=#d6d6d6
| 486540 ||  || — || November 15, 2006 || Mount Lemmon || Mount Lemmon Survey || 615 || align=right | 1.5 km || 
|-id=541 bgcolor=#E9E9E9
| 486541 ||  || — || January 21, 2013 || Haleakala || Pan-STARRS || — || align=right | 2.5 km || 
|-id=542 bgcolor=#E9E9E9
| 486542 ||  || — || April 12, 2013 || Haleakala || Pan-STARRS || ADE || align=right | 1.6 km || 
|-id=543 bgcolor=#E9E9E9
| 486543 ||  || — || February 13, 2004 || Kitt Peak || Spacewatch || — || align=right | 1.4 km || 
|-id=544 bgcolor=#E9E9E9
| 486544 ||  || — || January 20, 2008 || Kitt Peak || Spacewatch || — || align=right | 1.5 km || 
|-id=545 bgcolor=#E9E9E9
| 486545 ||  || — || March 5, 2013 || Haleakala || Pan-STARRS || — || align=right data-sort-value="0.90" | 900 m || 
|-id=546 bgcolor=#E9E9E9
| 486546 ||  || — || October 31, 2002 || Kitt Peak || Spacewatch || EUN || align=right data-sort-value="0.88" | 880 m || 
|-id=547 bgcolor=#E9E9E9
| 486547 ||  || — || September 20, 2001 || Socorro || LINEAR || — || align=right | 1.5 km || 
|-id=548 bgcolor=#E9E9E9
| 486548 ||  || — || March 6, 2008 || Mount Lemmon || Mount Lemmon Survey || — || align=right | 2.2 km || 
|-id=549 bgcolor=#E9E9E9
| 486549 ||  || — || December 28, 2011 || Kitt Peak || Spacewatch || — || align=right | 2.0 km || 
|-id=550 bgcolor=#d6d6d6
| 486550 ||  || — || November 11, 2010 || Mount Lemmon || Mount Lemmon Survey || — || align=right | 2.6 km || 
|-id=551 bgcolor=#E9E9E9
| 486551 ||  || — || November 1, 2006 || Kitt Peak || Spacewatch || — || align=right | 1.9 km || 
|-id=552 bgcolor=#E9E9E9
| 486552 ||  || — || October 21, 2011 || Mount Lemmon || Mount Lemmon Survey || — || align=right | 1.9 km || 
|-id=553 bgcolor=#d6d6d6
| 486553 ||  || — || October 4, 2004 || Kitt Peak || Spacewatch || — || align=right | 2.2 km || 
|-id=554 bgcolor=#E9E9E9
| 486554 ||  || — || March 29, 2004 || Kitt Peak || Spacewatch || — || align=right | 1.2 km || 
|-id=555 bgcolor=#E9E9E9
| 486555 ||  || — || November 24, 2011 || Haleakala || Pan-STARRS || — || align=right | 1.5 km || 
|-id=556 bgcolor=#E9E9E9
| 486556 ||  || — || October 21, 2011 || Catalina || CSS || — || align=right | 1.1 km || 
|-id=557 bgcolor=#d6d6d6
| 486557 ||  || — || April 9, 2013 || Haleakala || Pan-STARRS || — || align=right | 2.9 km || 
|-id=558 bgcolor=#E9E9E9
| 486558 ||  || — || October 17, 2010 || Mount Lemmon || Mount Lemmon Survey || — || align=right | 2.0 km || 
|-id=559 bgcolor=#E9E9E9
| 486559 ||  || — || April 9, 2013 || Haleakala || Pan-STARRS || HOF || align=right | 2.0 km || 
|-id=560 bgcolor=#E9E9E9
| 486560 ||  || — || January 26, 2012 || Haleakala || Pan-STARRS || HOF || align=right | 2.2 km || 
|-id=561 bgcolor=#d6d6d6
| 486561 ||  || — || November 1, 2005 || Mount Lemmon || Mount Lemmon Survey || EOS || align=right | 1.3 km || 
|-id=562 bgcolor=#d6d6d6
| 486562 ||  || — || September 30, 2005 || Mount Lemmon || Mount Lemmon Survey || — || align=right | 1.6 km || 
|-id=563 bgcolor=#E9E9E9
| 486563 ||  || — || April 9, 2013 || Haleakala || Pan-STARRS || — || align=right | 1.9 km || 
|-id=564 bgcolor=#d6d6d6
| 486564 ||  || — || September 29, 2005 || Mount Lemmon || Mount Lemmon Survey || — || align=right | 2.1 km || 
|-id=565 bgcolor=#d6d6d6
| 486565 ||  || — || September 30, 2010 || Mount Lemmon || Mount Lemmon Survey || — || align=right | 1.9 km || 
|-id=566 bgcolor=#E9E9E9
| 486566 ||  || — || October 19, 2011 || Kitt Peak || Spacewatch || — || align=right | 1.2 km || 
|-id=567 bgcolor=#d6d6d6
| 486567 ||  || — || January 29, 2012 || Haleakala || Pan-STARRS || — || align=right | 2.4 km || 
|-id=568 bgcolor=#E9E9E9
| 486568 ||  || — || September 14, 2010 || Kitt Peak || Spacewatch || — || align=right | 1.6 km || 
|-id=569 bgcolor=#E9E9E9
| 486569 ||  || — || February 6, 2008 || Kitt Peak || Spacewatch || — || align=right | 1.5 km || 
|-id=570 bgcolor=#E9E9E9
| 486570 ||  || — || April 9, 2013 || Haleakala || Pan-STARRS || MRX || align=right data-sort-value="0.77" | 770 m || 
|-id=571 bgcolor=#E9E9E9
| 486571 ||  || — || April 10, 2013 || Haleakala || Pan-STARRS || ADE || align=right | 1.4 km || 
|-id=572 bgcolor=#E9E9E9
| 486572 ||  || — || March 28, 2008 || Kitt Peak || Spacewatch || — || align=right | 1.9 km || 
|-id=573 bgcolor=#d6d6d6
| 486573 ||  || — || April 7, 2013 || Mount Lemmon || Mount Lemmon Survey || — || align=right | 2.1 km || 
|-id=574 bgcolor=#E9E9E9
| 486574 ||  || — || September 14, 2006 || Kitt Peak || Spacewatch || — || align=right | 1.1 km || 
|-id=575 bgcolor=#E9E9E9
| 486575 ||  || — || April 2, 2013 || Mount Lemmon || Mount Lemmon Survey || — || align=right | 1.9 km || 
|-id=576 bgcolor=#d6d6d6
| 486576 ||  || — || April 20, 2013 || Mount Lemmon || Mount Lemmon Survey || — || align=right | 3.6 km || 
|-id=577 bgcolor=#d6d6d6
| 486577 ||  || — || April 22, 2013 || Mount Lemmon || Mount Lemmon Survey || — || align=right | 3.1 km || 
|-id=578 bgcolor=#E9E9E9
| 486578 ||  || — || March 5, 2013 || Haleakala || Pan-STARRS || — || align=right data-sort-value="0.89" | 890 m || 
|-id=579 bgcolor=#E9E9E9
| 486579 ||  || — || March 11, 2008 || Mount Lemmon || Mount Lemmon Survey || DOR || align=right | 2.1 km || 
|-id=580 bgcolor=#d6d6d6
| 486580 ||  || — || February 20, 2012 || Haleakala || Pan-STARRS || NAE || align=right | 2.8 km || 
|-id=581 bgcolor=#E9E9E9
| 486581 ||  || — || May 3, 2000 || Socorro || LINEAR || — || align=right | 1.7 km || 
|-id=582 bgcolor=#E9E9E9
| 486582 ||  || — || October 11, 2010 || Mount Lemmon || Mount Lemmon Survey || — || align=right | 1.6 km || 
|-id=583 bgcolor=#E9E9E9
| 486583 ||  || — || January 20, 2012 || Mount Lemmon || Mount Lemmon Survey || — || align=right | 1.6 km || 
|-id=584 bgcolor=#d6d6d6
| 486584 ||  || — || January 22, 2012 || Haleakala || Pan-STARRS || EOS || align=right | 2.2 km || 
|-id=585 bgcolor=#E9E9E9
| 486585 ||  || — || March 16, 2004 || Kitt Peak || Spacewatch || EUN || align=right data-sort-value="0.86" | 860 m || 
|-id=586 bgcolor=#E9E9E9
| 486586 ||  || — || May 12, 2013 || Haleakala || Pan-STARRS || — || align=right | 2.0 km || 
|-id=587 bgcolor=#d6d6d6
| 486587 ||  || — || August 4, 2008 || La Sagra || OAM Obs. || Tj (2.99) || align=right | 6.2 km || 
|-id=588 bgcolor=#E9E9E9
| 486588 ||  || — || May 12, 2013 || Mount Lemmon || Mount Lemmon Survey || — || align=right | 2.5 km || 
|-id=589 bgcolor=#E9E9E9
| 486589 ||  || — || May 11, 2013 || Mount Lemmon || Mount Lemmon Survey || — || align=right | 1.4 km || 
|-id=590 bgcolor=#E9E9E9
| 486590 ||  || — || October 28, 1994 || Kitt Peak || Spacewatch || — || align=right | 3.3 km || 
|-id=591 bgcolor=#E9E9E9
| 486591 ||  || — || December 18, 2007 || Mount Lemmon || Mount Lemmon Survey || — || align=right | 1.7 km || 
|-id=592 bgcolor=#d6d6d6
| 486592 ||  || — || February 20, 2012 || Haleakala || Pan-STARRS || — || align=right | 3.4 km || 
|-id=593 bgcolor=#E9E9E9
| 486593 ||  || — || February 28, 2008 || Kitt Peak || Spacewatch || DOR || align=right | 2.0 km || 
|-id=594 bgcolor=#E9E9E9
| 486594 ||  || — || January 17, 2013 || Haleakala || Pan-STARRS || — || align=right | 1.3 km || 
|-id=595 bgcolor=#E9E9E9
| 486595 ||  || — || January 26, 2012 || Haleakala || Pan-STARRS || — || align=right | 2.2 km || 
|-id=596 bgcolor=#d6d6d6
| 486596 ||  || — || December 28, 2005 || Kitt Peak || Spacewatch || — || align=right | 3.0 km || 
|-id=597 bgcolor=#d6d6d6
| 486597 ||  || — || March 14, 2012 || Haleakala || Pan-STARRS || — || align=right | 3.8 km || 
|-id=598 bgcolor=#E9E9E9
| 486598 ||  || — || February 25, 2008 || Mount Lemmon || Mount Lemmon Survey || — || align=right | 1.9 km || 
|-id=599 bgcolor=#d6d6d6
| 486599 ||  || — || October 13, 2004 || Kitt Peak || Spacewatch || EOS || align=right | 2.1 km || 
|-id=600 bgcolor=#E9E9E9
| 486600 ||  || — || April 17, 2013 || Haleakala || Pan-STARRS || — || align=right | 2.0 km || 
|}

486601–486700 

|-bgcolor=#d6d6d6
| 486601 ||  || — || April 15, 2013 || Haleakala || Pan-STARRS || EOS || align=right | 1.9 km || 
|-id=602 bgcolor=#E9E9E9
| 486602 ||  || — || April 11, 2013 || Kitt Peak || Spacewatch || — || align=right | 2.4 km || 
|-id=603 bgcolor=#d6d6d6
| 486603 ||  || — || April 15, 2013 || Haleakala || Pan-STARRS || — || align=right | 3.1 km || 
|-id=604 bgcolor=#d6d6d6
| 486604 ||  || — || May 11, 2008 || Kitt Peak || Spacewatch || EOS || align=right | 1.8 km || 
|-id=605 bgcolor=#E9E9E9
| 486605 ||  || — || October 2, 2006 || Mount Lemmon || Mount Lemmon Survey || — || align=right | 1.5 km || 
|-id=606 bgcolor=#E9E9E9
| 486606 ||  || — || October 27, 2006 || Mount Lemmon || Mount Lemmon Survey || KON || align=right | 2.2 km || 
|-id=607 bgcolor=#FFC2E0
| 486607 ||  || — || March 10, 2000 || Catalina || CSS || AMO +1km || align=right data-sort-value="0.96" | 960 m || 
|-id=608 bgcolor=#E9E9E9
| 486608 ||  || — || November 6, 2010 || Mount Lemmon || Mount Lemmon Survey || EUN || align=right | 1.3 km || 
|-id=609 bgcolor=#d6d6d6
| 486609 ||  || — || April 15, 2013 || Haleakala || Pan-STARRS || — || align=right | 3.8 km || 
|-id=610 bgcolor=#d6d6d6
| 486610 ||  || — || February 14, 2013 || Haleakala || Pan-STARRS || — || align=right | 4.3 km || 
|-id=611 bgcolor=#d6d6d6
| 486611 ||  || — || April 13, 2013 || Mount Lemmon || Mount Lemmon Survey || — || align=right | 3.2 km || 
|-id=612 bgcolor=#d6d6d6
| 486612 ||  || — || May 5, 2013 || Haleakala || Pan-STARRS || — || align=right | 3.3 km || 
|-id=613 bgcolor=#d6d6d6
| 486613 ||  || — || April 7, 2013 || Mount Lemmon || Mount Lemmon Survey || EOS || align=right | 1.9 km || 
|-id=614 bgcolor=#d6d6d6
| 486614 ||  || — || December 3, 2010 || Kitt Peak || Spacewatch || — || align=right | 3.7 km || 
|-id=615 bgcolor=#E9E9E9
| 486615 ||  || — || January 17, 2013 || Haleakala || Pan-STARRS || — || align=right | 1.1 km || 
|-id=616 bgcolor=#E9E9E9
| 486616 ||  || — || January 2, 2012 || Mount Lemmon || Mount Lemmon Survey || — || align=right | 2.0 km || 
|-id=617 bgcolor=#E9E9E9
| 486617 ||  || — || December 1, 2010 || Mount Lemmon || Mount Lemmon Survey || — || align=right | 2.3 km || 
|-id=618 bgcolor=#d6d6d6
| 486618 ||  || — || February 4, 2012 || Haleakala || Pan-STARRS || — || align=right | 3.4 km || 
|-id=619 bgcolor=#d6d6d6
| 486619 ||  || — || April 15, 2013 || Haleakala || Pan-STARRS || — || align=right | 3.0 km || 
|-id=620 bgcolor=#d6d6d6
| 486620 ||  || — || May 16, 2013 || Haleakala || Pan-STARRS || — || align=right | 2.6 km || 
|-id=621 bgcolor=#E9E9E9
| 486621 ||  || — || April 26, 1995 || Kitt Peak || Spacewatch || — || align=right | 1.4 km || 
|-id=622 bgcolor=#d6d6d6
| 486622 ||  || — || February 14, 2013 || Haleakala || Pan-STARRS || — || align=right | 4.0 km || 
|-id=623 bgcolor=#E9E9E9
| 486623 ||  || — || September 5, 2010 || Mount Lemmon || Mount Lemmon Survey || — || align=right | 2.8 km || 
|-id=624 bgcolor=#d6d6d6
| 486624 ||  || — || January 21, 2012 || Haleakala || Pan-STARRS || — || align=right | 3.1 km || 
|-id=625 bgcolor=#d6d6d6
| 486625 ||  || — || January 22, 2012 || Haleakala || Pan-STARRS || — || align=right | 4.0 km || 
|-id=626 bgcolor=#E9E9E9
| 486626 ||  || — || July 10, 2005 || Siding Spring || SSS || — || align=right | 1.0 km || 
|-id=627 bgcolor=#d6d6d6
| 486627 ||  || — || May 8, 2013 || Haleakala || Pan-STARRS || — || align=right | 2.8 km || 
|-id=628 bgcolor=#d6d6d6
| 486628 ||  || — || May 29, 2008 || Kitt Peak || Spacewatch || — || align=right | 2.0 km || 
|-id=629 bgcolor=#d6d6d6
| 486629 ||  || — || May 15, 2013 || Haleakala || Pan-STARRS || EOS || align=right | 1.7 km || 
|-id=630 bgcolor=#E9E9E9
| 486630 ||  || — || January 26, 2012 || Haleakala || Pan-STARRS || — || align=right | 2.0 km || 
|-id=631 bgcolor=#E9E9E9
| 486631 ||  || — || February 2, 2008 || Mount Lemmon || Mount Lemmon Survey || — || align=right | 1.2 km || 
|-id=632 bgcolor=#d6d6d6
| 486632 ||  || — || February 4, 2012 || Haleakala || Pan-STARRS || EOS || align=right | 1.6 km || 
|-id=633 bgcolor=#FA8072
| 486633 ||  || — || November 24, 2011 || Haleakala || Pan-STARRS || H || align=right data-sort-value="0.55" | 550 m || 
|-id=634 bgcolor=#d6d6d6
| 486634 ||  || — || January 27, 2011 || Mount Lemmon || Mount Lemmon Survey || — || align=right | 3.3 km || 
|-id=635 bgcolor=#d6d6d6
| 486635 ||  || — || January 30, 2011 || Haleakala || Pan-STARRS || — || align=right | 3.2 km || 
|-id=636 bgcolor=#d6d6d6
| 486636 ||  || — || January 30, 2011 || Haleakala || Pan-STARRS || — || align=right | 3.2 km || 
|-id=637 bgcolor=#FA8072
| 486637 ||  || — || July 17, 2013 || Haleakala || Pan-STARRS || H || align=right data-sort-value="0.56" | 560 m || 
|-id=638 bgcolor=#FA8072
| 486638 ||  || — || November 3, 2011 || Catalina || CSS || H || align=right data-sort-value="0.96" | 960 m || 
|-id=639 bgcolor=#d6d6d6
| 486639 ||  || — || January 30, 2011 || Haleakala || Pan-STARRS || — || align=right | 3.4 km || 
|-id=640 bgcolor=#d6d6d6
| 486640 ||  || — || January 30, 2011 || Haleakala || Pan-STARRS || THB || align=right | 3.1 km || 
|-id=641 bgcolor=#d6d6d6
| 486641 ||  || — || January 2, 2011 || Mount Lemmon || Mount Lemmon Survey || — || align=right | 2.8 km || 
|-id=642 bgcolor=#d6d6d6
| 486642 ||  || — || August 1, 2013 || Haleakala || Pan-STARRS || — || align=right | 3.1 km || 
|-id=643 bgcolor=#E9E9E9
| 486643 ||  || — || April 5, 2003 || Kitt Peak || Spacewatch || — || align=right | 2.0 km || 
|-id=644 bgcolor=#d6d6d6
| 486644 ||  || — || January 27, 2006 || Anderson Mesa || LONEOS || — || align=right | 3.5 km || 
|-id=645 bgcolor=#fefefe
| 486645 ||  || — || August 1, 2013 || Haleakala || Pan-STARRS || H || align=right data-sort-value="0.57" | 570 m || 
|-id=646 bgcolor=#d6d6d6
| 486646 ||  || — || May 16, 2012 || Haleakala || Pan-STARRS || — || align=right | 3.1 km || 
|-id=647 bgcolor=#d6d6d6
| 486647 ||  || — || September 10, 2007 || Mount Lemmon || Mount Lemmon Survey || — || align=right | 3.7 km || 
|-id=648 bgcolor=#d6d6d6
| 486648 ||  || — || October 9, 2008 || Mount Lemmon || Mount Lemmon Survey || — || align=right | 2.6 km || 
|-id=649 bgcolor=#d6d6d6
| 486649 ||  || — || February 25, 2006 || Kitt Peak || Spacewatch || HYG || align=right | 2.2 km || 
|-id=650 bgcolor=#d6d6d6
| 486650 ||  || — || September 23, 2008 || Mount Lemmon || Mount Lemmon Survey || — || align=right | 4.6 km || 
|-id=651 bgcolor=#d6d6d6
| 486651 ||  || — || October 6, 2008 || Mount Lemmon || Mount Lemmon Survey || — || align=right | 2.5 km || 
|-id=652 bgcolor=#fefefe
| 486652 ||  || — || July 29, 2008 || Mount Lemmon || Mount Lemmon Survey || H || align=right data-sort-value="0.71" | 710 m || 
|-id=653 bgcolor=#fefefe
| 486653 ||  || — || August 1, 2013 || Haleakala || Pan-STARRS || H || align=right data-sort-value="0.56" | 560 m || 
|-id=654 bgcolor=#d6d6d6
| 486654 ||  || — || September 13, 2007 || Kitt Peak || Spacewatch || 7:4 || align=right | 3.7 km || 
|-id=655 bgcolor=#d6d6d6
| 486655 ||  || — || February 28, 2006 || Mount Lemmon || Mount Lemmon Survey || — || align=right | 3.1 km || 
|-id=656 bgcolor=#d6d6d6
| 486656 ||  || — || March 3, 2006 || Catalina || CSS || LIX || align=right | 4.3 km || 
|-id=657 bgcolor=#d6d6d6
| 486657 ||  || — || March 2, 2006 || Kitt Peak || Spacewatch || — || align=right | 2.5 km || 
|-id=658 bgcolor=#fefefe
| 486658 ||  || — || February 24, 2012 || Haleakala || Pan-STARRS || H || align=right data-sort-value="0.76" | 760 m || 
|-id=659 bgcolor=#d6d6d6
| 486659 ||  || — || February 1, 2006 || Kitt Peak || Spacewatch || — || align=right | 2.4 km || 
|-id=660 bgcolor=#d6d6d6
| 486660 ||  || — || December 26, 2005 || Mount Lemmon || Mount Lemmon Survey || — || align=right | 2.8 km || 
|-id=661 bgcolor=#d6d6d6
| 486661 ||  || — || August 26, 2013 || Haleakala || Pan-STARRS || — || align=right | 3.0 km || 
|-id=662 bgcolor=#d6d6d6
| 486662 ||  || — || January 30, 2011 || Haleakala || Pan-STARRS || — || align=right | 3.1 km || 
|-id=663 bgcolor=#d6d6d6
| 486663 ||  || — || July 14, 2013 || Haleakala || Pan-STARRS || — || align=right | 3.0 km || 
|-id=664 bgcolor=#fefefe
| 486664 ||  || — || January 26, 2012 || Haleakala || Pan-STARRS || H || align=right data-sort-value="0.69" | 690 m || 
|-id=665 bgcolor=#d6d6d6
| 486665 ||  || — || January 30, 2011 || Haleakala || Pan-STARRS || HYG || align=right | 2.7 km || 
|-id=666 bgcolor=#d6d6d6
| 486666 ||  || — || April 14, 2010 || WISE || WISE || 7:4 || align=right | 3.9 km || 
|-id=667 bgcolor=#fefefe
| 486667 ||  || — || September 6, 2008 || Mount Lemmon || Mount Lemmon Survey || H || align=right data-sort-value="0.52" | 520 m || 
|-id=668 bgcolor=#fefefe
| 486668 ||  || — || January 30, 2012 || Haleakala || Pan-STARRS || H || align=right data-sort-value="0.59" | 590 m || 
|-id=669 bgcolor=#d6d6d6
| 486669 ||  || — || April 24, 2012 || Mount Lemmon || Mount Lemmon Survey || — || align=right | 3.7 km || 
|-id=670 bgcolor=#FA8072
| 486670 ||  || — || February 26, 2012 || Haleakala || Pan-STARRS || H || align=right data-sort-value="0.59" | 590 m || 
|-id=671 bgcolor=#fefefe
| 486671 ||  || — || September 25, 2008 || Mount Lemmon || Mount Lemmon Survey || H || align=right data-sort-value="0.67" | 670 m || 
|-id=672 bgcolor=#fefefe
| 486672 ||  || — || March 29, 2012 || Haleakala || Pan-STARRS || H || align=right data-sort-value="0.47" | 470 m || 
|-id=673 bgcolor=#C2FFFF
| 486673 ||  || — || February 25, 2006 || Kitt Peak || Spacewatch || L5 || align=right | 5.9 km || 
|-id=674 bgcolor=#fefefe
| 486674 ||  || — || February 28, 2012 || Haleakala || Pan-STARRS || H || align=right data-sort-value="0.65" | 650 m || 
|-id=675 bgcolor=#C2FFFF
| 486675 ||  || — || September 1, 2013 || Mount Lemmon || Mount Lemmon Survey || L5 || align=right | 7.8 km || 
|-id=676 bgcolor=#fefefe
| 486676 ||  || — || September 17, 2003 || Kitt Peak || Spacewatch || H || align=right data-sort-value="0.52" | 520 m || 
|-id=677 bgcolor=#C2FFFF
| 486677 ||  || — || April 1, 2008 || Kitt Peak || Spacewatch || L5 || align=right | 8.5 km || 
|-id=678 bgcolor=#C2FFFF
| 486678 ||  || — || August 26, 2012 || Haleakala || Pan-STARRS || L5 || align=right | 7.4 km || 
|-id=679 bgcolor=#C2FFFF
| 486679 ||  || — || October 7, 2012 || Haleakala || Pan-STARRS || L5 || align=right | 9.8 km || 
|-id=680 bgcolor=#fefefe
| 486680 ||  || — || February 25, 2012 || Kitt Peak || Spacewatch || H || align=right data-sort-value="0.47" | 470 m || 
|-id=681 bgcolor=#C2FFFF
| 486681 ||  || — || March 15, 2007 || Kitt Peak || Spacewatch || L5 || align=right | 12 km || 
|-id=682 bgcolor=#fefefe
| 486682 ||  || — || March 14, 2004 || Socorro || LINEAR || H || align=right data-sort-value="0.75" | 750 m || 
|-id=683 bgcolor=#fefefe
| 486683 ||  || — || March 28, 2012 || Haleakala || Pan-STARRS || H || align=right data-sort-value="0.90" | 900 m || 
|-id=684 bgcolor=#fefefe
| 486684 ||  || — || May 13, 2004 || Socorro || LINEAR || H || align=right data-sort-value="0.71" | 710 m || 
|-id=685 bgcolor=#fefefe
| 486685 ||  || — || April 16, 2012 || Haleakala || Pan-STARRS || — || align=right data-sort-value="0.68" | 680 m || 
|-id=686 bgcolor=#C2FFFF
| 486686 ||  || — || October 4, 2013 || Mount Lemmon || Mount Lemmon Survey || L5 || align=right | 7.0 km || 
|-id=687 bgcolor=#fefefe
| 486687 ||  || — || March 16, 2012 || Haleakala || Pan-STARRS || H || align=right data-sort-value="0.57" | 570 m || 
|-id=688 bgcolor=#FA8072
| 486688 ||  || — || October 2, 2013 || Catalina || CSS || H || align=right data-sort-value="0.52" | 520 m || 
|-id=689 bgcolor=#fefefe
| 486689 ||  || — || July 8, 1997 || Kitt Peak || Spacewatch || H || align=right data-sort-value="0.85" | 850 m || 
|-id=690 bgcolor=#C2FFFF
| 486690 ||  || — || October 12, 2013 || Mount Lemmon || Mount Lemmon Survey || L5 || align=right | 7.5 km || 
|-id=691 bgcolor=#C2FFFF
| 486691 ||  || — || January 23, 2006 || Kitt Peak || Spacewatch || L5 || align=right | 9.7 km || 
|-id=692 bgcolor=#FFC2E0
| 486692 ||  || — || November 8, 2013 || Mount Lemmon || Mount Lemmon Survey || APO || align=right data-sort-value="0.51" | 510 m || 
|-id=693 bgcolor=#fefefe
| 486693 ||  || — || July 8, 2005 || Kitt Peak || Spacewatch || H || align=right data-sort-value="0.69" | 690 m || 
|-id=694 bgcolor=#fefefe
| 486694 ||  || — || December 1, 2005 || Mount Lemmon || Mount Lemmon Survey || H || align=right data-sort-value="0.47" | 470 m || 
|-id=695 bgcolor=#C2FFFF
| 486695 ||  || — || April 11, 2010 || WISE || WISE || L5 || align=right | 13 km || 
|-id=696 bgcolor=#fefefe
| 486696 ||  || — || December 2, 2005 || Kitt Peak || Spacewatch || H || align=right data-sort-value="0.61" | 610 m || 
|-id=697 bgcolor=#fefefe
| 486697 ||  || — || March 7, 2009 || Siding Spring || SSS || H || align=right data-sort-value="0.72" | 720 m || 
|-id=698 bgcolor=#fefefe
| 486698 ||  || — || February 15, 2012 || Haleakala || Pan-STARRS || H || align=right data-sort-value="0.71" | 710 m || 
|-id=699 bgcolor=#fefefe
| 486699 ||  || — || February 1, 2009 || Catalina || CSS || H || align=right data-sort-value="0.93" | 930 m || 
|-id=700 bgcolor=#fefefe
| 486700 ||  || — || January 30, 2011 || Haleakala || Pan-STARRS || — || align=right data-sort-value="0.62" | 620 m || 
|}

486701–486800 

|-bgcolor=#fefefe
| 486701 ||  || — || May 1, 2011 || Haleakala || Pan-STARRS || — || align=right data-sort-value="0.83" | 830 m || 
|-id=702 bgcolor=#fefefe
| 486702 ||  || — || October 21, 2003 || Kitt Peak || Spacewatch || — || align=right data-sort-value="0.59" | 590 m || 
|-id=703 bgcolor=#fefefe
| 486703 ||  || — || November 7, 2010 || Catalina || CSS || H || align=right data-sort-value="0.94" | 940 m || 
|-id=704 bgcolor=#fefefe
| 486704 ||  || — || December 30, 2013 || Kitt Peak || Spacewatch || — || align=right data-sort-value="0.83" | 830 m || 
|-id=705 bgcolor=#fefefe
| 486705 ||  || — || January 4, 2014 || Haleakala || Pan-STARRS || H || align=right data-sort-value="0.64" | 640 m || 
|-id=706 bgcolor=#fefefe
| 486706 ||  || — || January 20, 2009 || Mount Lemmon || Mount Lemmon Survey || H || align=right data-sort-value="0.79" | 790 m || 
|-id=707 bgcolor=#fefefe
| 486707 ||  || — || August 26, 2012 || Haleakala || Pan-STARRS || — || align=right data-sort-value="0.68" | 680 m || 
|-id=708 bgcolor=#fefefe
| 486708 ||  || — || January 2, 2014 || Kitt Peak || Spacewatch || H || align=right data-sort-value="0.60" | 600 m || 
|-id=709 bgcolor=#fefefe
| 486709 ||  || — || June 9, 2012 || Haleakala || Pan-STARRS || H || align=right data-sort-value="0.84" | 840 m || 
|-id=710 bgcolor=#fefefe
| 486710 ||  || — || January 30, 2011 || Haleakala || Pan-STARRS || — || align=right data-sort-value="0.74" | 740 m || 
|-id=711 bgcolor=#fefefe
| 486711 ||  || — || January 19, 2014 || Haleakala || Pan-STARRS || H || align=right data-sort-value="0.74" | 740 m || 
|-id=712 bgcolor=#fefefe
| 486712 ||  || — || November 1, 2013 || Mount Lemmon || Mount Lemmon Survey || — || align=right data-sort-value="0.61" | 610 m || 
|-id=713 bgcolor=#fefefe
| 486713 ||  || — || May 6, 2011 || Catalina || CSS || — || align=right | 1.1 km || 
|-id=714 bgcolor=#fefefe
| 486714 ||  || — || January 9, 2014 || Haleakala || Pan-STARRS || H || align=right data-sort-value="0.69" | 690 m || 
|-id=715 bgcolor=#fefefe
| 486715 ||  || — || January 23, 2014 || Kitt Peak || Spacewatch || V || align=right data-sort-value="0.72" | 720 m || 
|-id=716 bgcolor=#fefefe
| 486716 ||  || — || December 31, 2002 || Socorro || LINEAR || H || align=right data-sort-value="0.79" | 790 m || 
|-id=717 bgcolor=#fefefe
| 486717 ||  || — || January 31, 2003 || Socorro || LINEAR || H || align=right data-sort-value="0.72" | 720 m || 
|-id=718 bgcolor=#fefefe
| 486718 ||  || — || September 7, 2004 || Socorro || LINEAR || H || align=right data-sort-value="0.53" | 530 m || 
|-id=719 bgcolor=#fefefe
| 486719 ||  || — || December 26, 2013 || Mount Lemmon || Mount Lemmon Survey || H || align=right data-sort-value="0.62" | 620 m || 
|-id=720 bgcolor=#fefefe
| 486720 ||  || — || June 12, 2012 || Haleakala || Pan-STARRS || H || align=right data-sort-value="0.61" | 610 m || 
|-id=721 bgcolor=#fefefe
| 486721 ||  || — || March 10, 2007 || Mount Lemmon || Mount Lemmon Survey || — || align=right data-sort-value="0.73" | 730 m || 
|-id=722 bgcolor=#fefefe
| 486722 ||  || — || September 11, 2012 || Siding Spring || SSS || H || align=right data-sort-value="0.71" | 710 m || 
|-id=723 bgcolor=#fefefe
| 486723 ||  || — || August 26, 2012 || Mount Lemmon || Mount Lemmon Survey || H || align=right data-sort-value="0.73" | 730 m || 
|-id=724 bgcolor=#fefefe
| 486724 ||  || — || January 3, 2014 || Mount Lemmon || Mount Lemmon Survey || — || align=right data-sort-value="0.86" | 860 m || 
|-id=725 bgcolor=#FA8072
| 486725 ||  || — || October 11, 2010 || Mount Lemmon || Mount Lemmon Survey || — || align=right data-sort-value="0.47" | 470 m || 
|-id=726 bgcolor=#fefefe
| 486726 ||  || — || September 30, 2005 || Mount Lemmon || Mount Lemmon Survey || — || align=right data-sort-value="0.78" | 780 m || 
|-id=727 bgcolor=#fefefe
| 486727 ||  || — || February 22, 2014 || Mount Lemmon || Mount Lemmon Survey || — || align=right data-sort-value="0.70" | 700 m || 
|-id=728 bgcolor=#fefefe
| 486728 ||  || — || October 15, 2012 || Haleakala || Pan-STARRS || — || align=right data-sort-value="0.71" | 710 m || 
|-id=729 bgcolor=#fefefe
| 486729 ||  || — || April 16, 2004 || Kitt Peak || Spacewatch || — || align=right data-sort-value="0.68" | 680 m || 
|-id=730 bgcolor=#fefefe
| 486730 ||  || — || February 26, 2014 || Haleakala || Pan-STARRS || — || align=right data-sort-value="0.65" | 650 m || 
|-id=731 bgcolor=#fefefe
| 486731 ||  || — || October 7, 2012 || Haleakala || Pan-STARRS || V || align=right data-sort-value="0.56" | 560 m || 
|-id=732 bgcolor=#E9E9E9
| 486732 ||  || — || February 10, 2014 || Haleakala || Pan-STARRS || — || align=right | 1.3 km || 
|-id=733 bgcolor=#fefefe
| 486733 ||  || — || January 17, 2007 || Kitt Peak || Spacewatch || — || align=right data-sort-value="0.51" | 510 m || 
|-id=734 bgcolor=#fefefe
| 486734 ||  || — || October 8, 2012 || Haleakala || Pan-STARRS || — || align=right data-sort-value="0.88" | 880 m || 
|-id=735 bgcolor=#fefefe
| 486735 ||  || — || April 7, 2011 || Kitt Peak || Spacewatch || — || align=right data-sort-value="0.62" | 620 m || 
|-id=736 bgcolor=#fefefe
| 486736 ||  || — || September 30, 2005 || Kitt Peak || Spacewatch || — || align=right data-sort-value="0.71" | 710 m || 
|-id=737 bgcolor=#fefefe
| 486737 ||  || — || February 28, 2014 || Haleakala || Pan-STARRS || — || align=right data-sort-value="0.69" | 690 m || 
|-id=738 bgcolor=#fefefe
| 486738 ||  || — || October 17, 2012 || Haleakala || Pan-STARRS || — || align=right data-sort-value="0.64" | 640 m || 
|-id=739 bgcolor=#FFC2E0
| 486739 ||  || — || March 8, 2014 || Mount Lemmon || Mount Lemmon Survey || APO || align=right data-sort-value="0.45" | 450 m || 
|-id=740 bgcolor=#fefefe
| 486740 ||  || — || March 15, 2004 || Kitt Peak || Spacewatch || — || align=right data-sort-value="0.54" | 540 m || 
|-id=741 bgcolor=#fefefe
| 486741 ||  || — || January 26, 2007 || Kitt Peak || Spacewatch || — || align=right data-sort-value="0.85" | 850 m || 
|-id=742 bgcolor=#fefefe
| 486742 ||  || — || April 2, 2011 || Kitt Peak || Spacewatch || — || align=right data-sort-value="0.55" | 550 m || 
|-id=743 bgcolor=#fefefe
| 486743 ||  || — || November 9, 2009 || Kitt Peak || Spacewatch || — || align=right data-sort-value="0.78" | 780 m || 
|-id=744 bgcolor=#FA8072
| 486744 ||  || — || February 26, 2014 || Haleakala || Pan-STARRS || — || align=right data-sort-value="0.76" | 760 m || 
|-id=745 bgcolor=#fefefe
| 486745 ||  || — || August 14, 2012 || Haleakala || Pan-STARRS || — || align=right data-sort-value="0.77" | 770 m || 
|-id=746 bgcolor=#fefefe
| 486746 ||  || — || March 25, 2007 || Mount Lemmon || Mount Lemmon Survey || — || align=right data-sort-value="0.67" | 670 m || 
|-id=747 bgcolor=#fefefe
| 486747 ||  || — || December 10, 2009 || Mount Lemmon || Mount Lemmon Survey || — || align=right data-sort-value="0.77" | 770 m || 
|-id=748 bgcolor=#fefefe
| 486748 ||  || — || February 26, 2014 || Haleakala || Pan-STARRS || — || align=right data-sort-value="0.82" | 820 m || 
|-id=749 bgcolor=#fefefe
| 486749 ||  || — || August 11, 2012 || Haleakala || Pan-STARRS || — || align=right data-sort-value="0.79" | 790 m || 
|-id=750 bgcolor=#fefefe
| 486750 ||  || — || October 21, 2012 || Haleakala || Pan-STARRS || — || align=right data-sort-value="0.80" | 800 m || 
|-id=751 bgcolor=#E9E9E9
| 486751 ||  || — || December 12, 2012 || Mount Lemmon || Mount Lemmon Survey || MAR || align=right data-sort-value="0.98" | 980 m || 
|-id=752 bgcolor=#fefefe
| 486752 ||  || — || September 23, 2008 || Mount Lemmon || Mount Lemmon Survey || V || align=right data-sort-value="0.56" | 560 m || 
|-id=753 bgcolor=#fefefe
| 486753 ||  || — || March 27, 2014 || Haleakala || Pan-STARRS || — || align=right data-sort-value="0.71" | 710 m || 
|-id=754 bgcolor=#fefefe
| 486754 ||  || — || August 10, 2011 || Haleakala || Pan-STARRS || — || align=right data-sort-value="0.76" | 760 m || 
|-id=755 bgcolor=#fefefe
| 486755 ||  || — || June 2, 2011 || Haleakala || Pan-STARRS || — || align=right data-sort-value="0.63" | 630 m || 
|-id=756 bgcolor=#E9E9E9
| 486756 ||  || — || January 7, 2013 || Haleakala || Pan-STARRS || — || align=right | 1.3 km || 
|-id=757 bgcolor=#fefefe
| 486757 ||  || — || October 17, 2012 || Haleakala || Pan-STARRS || — || align=right data-sort-value="0.80" | 800 m || 
|-id=758 bgcolor=#fefefe
| 486758 ||  || — || February 10, 2014 || Haleakala || Pan-STARRS || — || align=right data-sort-value="0.79" | 790 m || 
|-id=759 bgcolor=#E9E9E9
| 486759 ||  || — || January 10, 2014 || Haleakala || Pan-STARRS || — || align=right | 1.6 km || 
|-id=760 bgcolor=#d6d6d6
| 486760 ||  || — || September 23, 2011 || Haleakala || Pan-STARRS || KOR || align=right | 1.3 km || 
|-id=761 bgcolor=#fefefe
| 486761 ||  || — || February 28, 2014 || Haleakala || Pan-STARRS || — || align=right data-sort-value="0.61" | 610 m || 
|-id=762 bgcolor=#fefefe
| 486762 ||  || — || April 15, 2007 || Kitt Peak || Spacewatch || — || align=right data-sort-value="0.68" | 680 m || 
|-id=763 bgcolor=#fefefe
| 486763 ||  || — || February 10, 2007 || Mount Lemmon || Mount Lemmon Survey || — || align=right data-sort-value="0.64" | 640 m || 
|-id=764 bgcolor=#fefefe
| 486764 ||  || — || May 24, 2011 || Haleakala || Pan-STARRS || — || align=right data-sort-value="0.55" | 550 m || 
|-id=765 bgcolor=#fefefe
| 486765 ||  || — || October 12, 2005 || Kitt Peak || Spacewatch || — || align=right data-sort-value="0.73" | 730 m || 
|-id=766 bgcolor=#fefefe
| 486766 ||  || — || May 10, 2007 || Mount Lemmon || Mount Lemmon Survey || — || align=right data-sort-value="0.71" | 710 m || 
|-id=767 bgcolor=#fefefe
| 486767 ||  || — || April 19, 2007 || Mount Lemmon || Mount Lemmon Survey || — || align=right data-sort-value="0.63" | 630 m || 
|-id=768 bgcolor=#fefefe
| 486768 ||  || — || November 14, 2012 || Mount Lemmon || Mount Lemmon Survey || — || align=right data-sort-value="0.75" | 750 m || 
|-id=769 bgcolor=#fefefe
| 486769 ||  || — || January 26, 2001 || Kitt Peak || Spacewatch || — || align=right data-sort-value="0.47" | 470 m || 
|-id=770 bgcolor=#E9E9E9
| 486770 ||  || — || June 19, 2006 || Mount Lemmon || Mount Lemmon Survey || — || align=right | 2.1 km || 
|-id=771 bgcolor=#E9E9E9
| 486771 ||  || — || August 22, 2006 || Siding Spring || SSS || — || align=right | 2.2 km || 
|-id=772 bgcolor=#fefefe
| 486772 ||  || — || March 25, 2014 || Kitt Peak || Spacewatch || V || align=right data-sort-value="0.60" | 600 m || 
|-id=773 bgcolor=#fefefe
| 486773 ||  || — || October 27, 2005 || Kitt Peak || Spacewatch || — || align=right data-sort-value="0.71" | 710 m || 
|-id=774 bgcolor=#fefefe
| 486774 ||  || — || December 2, 2005 || Kitt Peak || Spacewatch || V || align=right data-sort-value="0.47" | 470 m || 
|-id=775 bgcolor=#fefefe
| 486775 ||  || — || April 18, 2007 || Mount Lemmon || Mount Lemmon Survey || — || align=right data-sort-value="0.61" | 610 m || 
|-id=776 bgcolor=#fefefe
| 486776 ||  || — || October 27, 2005 || Mount Lemmon || Mount Lemmon Survey || — || align=right data-sort-value="0.67" | 670 m || 
|-id=777 bgcolor=#fefefe
| 486777 ||  || — || September 5, 2008 || Kitt Peak || Spacewatch || — || align=right data-sort-value="0.75" | 750 m || 
|-id=778 bgcolor=#fefefe
| 486778 ||  || — || March 27, 2014 || Haleakala || Pan-STARRS || — || align=right data-sort-value="0.81" | 810 m || 
|-id=779 bgcolor=#fefefe
| 486779 ||  || — || March 15, 2007 || Kitt Peak || Spacewatch || — || align=right data-sort-value="0.65" | 650 m || 
|-id=780 bgcolor=#fefefe
| 486780 ||  || — || April 2, 2014 || Mount Lemmon || Mount Lemmon Survey || — || align=right data-sort-value="0.55" | 550 m || 
|-id=781 bgcolor=#fefefe
| 486781 ||  || — || August 23, 2011 || Haleakala || Pan-STARRS || — || align=right data-sort-value="0.75" | 750 m || 
|-id=782 bgcolor=#fefefe
| 486782 ||  || — || March 3, 2000 || Kitt Peak || Spacewatch || — || align=right data-sort-value="0.58" | 580 m || 
|-id=783 bgcolor=#fefefe
| 486783 ||  || — || February 25, 2007 || Mount Lemmon || Mount Lemmon Survey || — || align=right data-sort-value="0.63" | 630 m || 
|-id=784 bgcolor=#fefefe
| 486784 ||  || — || January 11, 2010 || Kitt Peak || Spacewatch || — || align=right data-sort-value="0.66" | 660 m || 
|-id=785 bgcolor=#E9E9E9
| 486785 ||  || — || December 3, 2012 || Catalina || CSS || EUN || align=right | 1.2 km || 
|-id=786 bgcolor=#fefefe
| 486786 ||  || — || October 5, 2012 || Haleakala || Pan-STARRS || — || align=right data-sort-value="0.71" | 710 m || 
|-id=787 bgcolor=#fefefe
| 486787 ||  || — || August 24, 2011 || Haleakala || Pan-STARRS || — || align=right data-sort-value="0.68" | 680 m || 
|-id=788 bgcolor=#fefefe
| 486788 ||  || — || November 1, 2005 || Mount Lemmon || Mount Lemmon Survey || — || align=right data-sort-value="0.71" | 710 m || 
|-id=789 bgcolor=#fefefe
| 486789 ||  || — || February 23, 2007 || Kitt Peak || Spacewatch || — || align=right data-sort-value="0.65" | 650 m || 
|-id=790 bgcolor=#fefefe
| 486790 ||  || — || October 1, 2008 || Mount Lemmon || Mount Lemmon Survey || — || align=right data-sort-value="0.82" | 820 m || 
|-id=791 bgcolor=#fefefe
| 486791 ||  || — || August 29, 2011 || Siding Spring || SSS || — || align=right data-sort-value="0.73" | 730 m || 
|-id=792 bgcolor=#fefefe
| 486792 ||  || — || March 10, 2014 || Kitt Peak || Spacewatch || — || align=right data-sort-value="0.65" | 650 m || 
|-id=793 bgcolor=#fefefe
| 486793 ||  || — || March 13, 2007 || Mount Lemmon || Mount Lemmon Survey || — || align=right data-sort-value="0.70" | 700 m || 
|-id=794 bgcolor=#fefefe
| 486794 ||  || — || August 24, 2011 || La Sagra || OAM Obs. || — || align=right data-sort-value="0.89" | 890 m || 
|-id=795 bgcolor=#fefefe
| 486795 ||  || — || November 17, 2009 || Mount Lemmon || Mount Lemmon Survey || — || align=right data-sort-value="0.57" | 570 m || 
|-id=796 bgcolor=#fefefe
| 486796 ||  || — || January 30, 2006 || Kitt Peak || Spacewatch || — || align=right data-sort-value="0.80" | 800 m || 
|-id=797 bgcolor=#fefefe
| 486797 ||  || — || February 28, 2014 || Haleakala || Pan-STARRS || — || align=right data-sort-value="0.84" | 840 m || 
|-id=798 bgcolor=#fefefe
| 486798 ||  || — || December 26, 2006 || Kitt Peak || Spacewatch || — || align=right data-sort-value="0.71" | 710 m || 
|-id=799 bgcolor=#fefefe
| 486799 ||  || — || December 8, 2012 || Mount Lemmon || Mount Lemmon Survey || — || align=right data-sort-value="0.75" | 750 m || 
|-id=800 bgcolor=#E9E9E9
| 486800 ||  || — || April 28, 2014 || Haleakala || Pan-STARRS || MAR || align=right data-sort-value="0.93" | 930 m || 
|}

486801–486900 

|-bgcolor=#d6d6d6
| 486801 ||  || — || February 9, 2013 || Haleakala || Pan-STARRS || — || align=right | 3.3 km || 
|-id=802 bgcolor=#fefefe
| 486802 ||  || — || January 7, 2013 || Haleakala || Pan-STARRS || — || align=right data-sort-value="0.80" | 800 m || 
|-id=803 bgcolor=#fefefe
| 486803 ||  || — || April 14, 2007 || Mount Lemmon || Mount Lemmon Survey || — || align=right data-sort-value="0.79" | 790 m || 
|-id=804 bgcolor=#fefefe
| 486804 ||  || — || April 4, 2014 || Kitt Peak || Spacewatch || V || align=right data-sort-value="0.51" | 510 m || 
|-id=805 bgcolor=#fefefe
| 486805 ||  || — || April 15, 2007 || Kitt Peak || Spacewatch || — || align=right data-sort-value="0.64" | 640 m || 
|-id=806 bgcolor=#fefefe
| 486806 ||  || — || September 20, 2011 || Haleakala || Pan-STARRS || V || align=right data-sort-value="0.60" | 600 m || 
|-id=807 bgcolor=#fefefe
| 486807 ||  || — || February 14, 2010 || Mount Lemmon || Mount Lemmon Survey || — || align=right data-sort-value="0.64" | 640 m || 
|-id=808 bgcolor=#d6d6d6
| 486808 ||  || — || April 29, 2014 || Haleakala || Pan-STARRS || EOS || align=right | 1.6 km || 
|-id=809 bgcolor=#fefefe
| 486809 ||  || — || March 28, 2014 || Haleakala || Pan-STARRS || — || align=right data-sort-value="0.96" | 960 m || 
|-id=810 bgcolor=#d6d6d6
| 486810 ||  || — || November 25, 2011 || Haleakala || Pan-STARRS || EOS || align=right | 2.4 km || 
|-id=811 bgcolor=#FA8072
| 486811 ||  || — || March 26, 2014 || Mount Lemmon || Mount Lemmon Survey || — || align=right data-sort-value="0.62" | 620 m || 
|-id=812 bgcolor=#fefefe
| 486812 ||  || — || October 25, 2012 || Kitt Peak || Spacewatch || — || align=right data-sort-value="0.73" | 730 m || 
|-id=813 bgcolor=#FA8072
| 486813 ||  || — || July 9, 2011 || Haleakala || Pan-STARRS || — || align=right data-sort-value="0.88" | 880 m || 
|-id=814 bgcolor=#d6d6d6
| 486814 ||  || — || May 2, 2014 || Kitt Peak || Spacewatch || — || align=right | 2.8 km || 
|-id=815 bgcolor=#E9E9E9
| 486815 ||  || — || April 4, 2014 || Haleakala || Pan-STARRS || — || align=right | 1.0 km || 
|-id=816 bgcolor=#fefefe
| 486816 ||  || — || August 24, 2011 || Haleakala || Pan-STARRS || — || align=right data-sort-value="0.73" | 730 m || 
|-id=817 bgcolor=#fefefe
| 486817 ||  || — || September 11, 2005 || Kitt Peak || Spacewatch || — || align=right data-sort-value="0.70" | 700 m || 
|-id=818 bgcolor=#fefefe
| 486818 ||  || — || March 9, 2014 || Haleakala || Pan-STARRS || — || align=right data-sort-value="0.98" | 980 m || 
|-id=819 bgcolor=#fefefe
| 486819 ||  || — || May 9, 1996 || Kitt Peak || Spacewatch || — || align=right data-sort-value="0.75" | 750 m || 
|-id=820 bgcolor=#E9E9E9
| 486820 ||  || — || February 14, 2013 || Haleakala || Pan-STARRS || — || align=right | 2.3 km || 
|-id=821 bgcolor=#fefefe
| 486821 ||  || — || June 5, 1997 || Kitt Peak || Spacewatch || — || align=right data-sort-value="0.68" | 680 m || 
|-id=822 bgcolor=#fefefe
| 486822 ||  || — || April 4, 2014 || Haleakala || Pan-STARRS || — || align=right data-sort-value="0.94" | 940 m || 
|-id=823 bgcolor=#fefefe
| 486823 ||  || — || August 1, 2011 || La Sagra || OAM Obs. || — || align=right | 1.0 km || 
|-id=824 bgcolor=#d6d6d6
| 486824 ||  || — || February 9, 2013 || Haleakala || Pan-STARRS || — || align=right | 2.8 km || 
|-id=825 bgcolor=#d6d6d6
| 486825 ||  || — || April 8, 2014 || Haleakala || Pan-STARRS || — || align=right | 3.7 km || 
|-id=826 bgcolor=#E9E9E9
| 486826 ||  || — || April 6, 2014 || Mount Lemmon || Mount Lemmon Survey || ADE || align=right | 2.0 km || 
|-id=827 bgcolor=#fefefe
| 486827 ||  || — || September 19, 2011 || Haleakala || Pan-STARRS || V || align=right data-sort-value="0.89" | 890 m || 
|-id=828 bgcolor=#fefefe
| 486828 ||  || — || August 30, 2011 || Haleakala || Pan-STARRS || — || align=right data-sort-value="0.86" | 860 m || 
|-id=829 bgcolor=#fefefe
| 486829 ||  || — || April 26, 2007 || Mount Lemmon || Mount Lemmon Survey || (2076) || align=right data-sort-value="0.78" | 780 m || 
|-id=830 bgcolor=#fefefe
| 486830 ||  || — || August 2, 2011 || Haleakala || Pan-STARRS || — || align=right data-sort-value="0.92" | 920 m || 
|-id=831 bgcolor=#fefefe
| 486831 ||  || — || May 4, 2014 || Haleakala || Pan-STARRS || — || align=right data-sort-value="0.87" | 870 m || 
|-id=832 bgcolor=#fefefe
| 486832 ||  || — || April 13, 2004 || Kitt Peak || Spacewatch || — || align=right data-sort-value="0.49" | 490 m || 
|-id=833 bgcolor=#E9E9E9
| 486833 ||  || — || March 12, 2014 || Haleakala || Pan-STARRS || ADE || align=right | 2.3 km || 
|-id=834 bgcolor=#E9E9E9
| 486834 ||  || — || October 26, 2011 || Haleakala || Pan-STARRS || — || align=right | 2.9 km || 
|-id=835 bgcolor=#fefefe
| 486835 ||  || — || January 17, 2007 || Kitt Peak || Spacewatch || — || align=right data-sort-value="0.64" | 640 m || 
|-id=836 bgcolor=#fefefe
| 486836 ||  || — || October 21, 2012 || Haleakala || Pan-STARRS || — || align=right data-sort-value="0.64" | 640 m || 
|-id=837 bgcolor=#fefefe
| 486837 ||  || — || December 8, 2012 || Mount Lemmon || Mount Lemmon Survey || — || align=right data-sort-value="0.75" | 750 m || 
|-id=838 bgcolor=#fefefe
| 486838 ||  || — || February 16, 2010 || Mount Lemmon || Mount Lemmon Survey || — || align=right data-sort-value="0.80" | 800 m || 
|-id=839 bgcolor=#fefefe
| 486839 ||  || — || October 28, 2005 || Kitt Peak || Spacewatch || — || align=right data-sort-value="0.73" | 730 m || 
|-id=840 bgcolor=#fefefe
| 486840 ||  || — || May 7, 2014 || Haleakala || Pan-STARRS || — || align=right data-sort-value="0.83" | 830 m || 
|-id=841 bgcolor=#E9E9E9
| 486841 ||  || — || October 23, 2011 || Haleakala || Pan-STARRS || EUN || align=right | 1.6 km || 
|-id=842 bgcolor=#fefefe
| 486842 ||  || — || March 28, 2014 || Mount Lemmon || Mount Lemmon Survey || — || align=right data-sort-value="0.90" | 900 m || 
|-id=843 bgcolor=#fefefe
| 486843 ||  || — || September 23, 2011 || Haleakala || Pan-STARRS || — || align=right data-sort-value="0.73" | 730 m || 
|-id=844 bgcolor=#fefefe
| 486844 ||  || — || February 9, 2010 || Kitt Peak || Spacewatch || MAS || align=right data-sort-value="0.67" | 670 m || 
|-id=845 bgcolor=#E9E9E9
| 486845 ||  || — || October 21, 2007 || Kitt Peak || Spacewatch || — || align=right | 1.0 km || 
|-id=846 bgcolor=#fefefe
| 486846 ||  || — || March 15, 2007 || Mount Lemmon || Mount Lemmon Survey || — || align=right data-sort-value="0.68" | 680 m || 
|-id=847 bgcolor=#E9E9E9
| 486847 ||  || — || March 10, 2005 || Mount Lemmon || Mount Lemmon Survey || MAR || align=right | 1.1 km || 
|-id=848 bgcolor=#fefefe
| 486848 ||  || — || September 23, 2011 || Haleakala || Pan-STARRS || NYS || align=right data-sort-value="0.68" | 680 m || 
|-id=849 bgcolor=#fefefe
| 486849 ||  || — || May 8, 2014 || Haleakala || Pan-STARRS || critical || align=right data-sort-value="0.78" | 780 m || 
|-id=850 bgcolor=#fefefe
| 486850 ||  || — || March 15, 2007 || Mount Lemmon || Mount Lemmon Survey || (2076) || align=right data-sort-value="0.60" | 600 m || 
|-id=851 bgcolor=#fefefe
| 486851 ||  || — || September 23, 2008 || Kitt Peak || Spacewatch || — || align=right data-sort-value="0.92" | 920 m || 
|-id=852 bgcolor=#fefefe
| 486852 ||  || — || April 16, 2007 || Mount Lemmon || Mount Lemmon Survey || — || align=right data-sort-value="0.57" | 570 m || 
|-id=853 bgcolor=#fefefe
| 486853 ||  || — || November 24, 2012 || Kitt Peak || Spacewatch || — || align=right data-sort-value="0.76" | 760 m || 
|-id=854 bgcolor=#fefefe
| 486854 ||  || — || January 26, 2006 || Kitt Peak || Spacewatch || NYS || align=right data-sort-value="0.56" | 560 m || 
|-id=855 bgcolor=#fefefe
| 486855 ||  || — || August 31, 2011 || Haleakala || Pan-STARRS || V || align=right data-sort-value="0.65" | 650 m || 
|-id=856 bgcolor=#fefefe
| 486856 ||  || — || October 24, 2005 || Anderson Mesa || LONEOS || — || align=right data-sort-value="0.89" | 890 m || 
|-id=857 bgcolor=#fefefe
| 486857 ||  || — || April 24, 2014 || Haleakala || Pan-STARRS || V || align=right data-sort-value="0.59" | 590 m || 
|-id=858 bgcolor=#FA8072
| 486858 ||  || — || May 27, 1998 || Kitt Peak || Spacewatch || — || align=right data-sort-value="0.46" | 460 m || 
|-id=859 bgcolor=#fefefe
| 486859 ||  || — || February 28, 2014 || Haleakala || Pan-STARRS || V || align=right data-sort-value="0.75" | 750 m || 
|-id=860 bgcolor=#E9E9E9
| 486860 ||  || — || March 26, 2009 || Catalina || CSS || — || align=right | 3.0 km || 
|-id=861 bgcolor=#fefefe
| 486861 ||  || — || October 7, 2008 || Mount Lemmon || Mount Lemmon Survey || — || align=right data-sort-value="0.58" | 580 m || 
|-id=862 bgcolor=#E9E9E9
| 486862 ||  || — || March 24, 2014 || Haleakala || Pan-STARRS || — || align=right | 2.2 km || 
|-id=863 bgcolor=#fefefe
| 486863 ||  || — || April 14, 2007 || Mount Lemmon || Mount Lemmon Survey || — || align=right data-sort-value="0.76" | 760 m || 
|-id=864 bgcolor=#fefefe
| 486864 ||  || — || June 11, 2011 || Haleakala || Pan-STARRS || — || align=right | 1.2 km || 
|-id=865 bgcolor=#fefefe
| 486865 ||  || — || October 23, 2008 || Kitt Peak || Spacewatch || — || align=right | 2.2 km || 
|-id=866 bgcolor=#fefefe
| 486866 ||  || — || March 14, 2010 || Mount Lemmon || Mount Lemmon Survey || — || align=right data-sort-value="0.68" | 680 m || 
|-id=867 bgcolor=#fefefe
| 486867 ||  || — || March 12, 2002 || Kitt Peak || Spacewatch || — || align=right data-sort-value="0.95" | 950 m || 
|-id=868 bgcolor=#E9E9E9
| 486868 ||  || — || March 9, 2010 || WISE || WISE || — || align=right | 2.6 km || 
|-id=869 bgcolor=#fefefe
| 486869 ||  || — || February 28, 2014 || Haleakala || Pan-STARRS || — || align=right data-sort-value="0.84" | 840 m || 
|-id=870 bgcolor=#E9E9E9
| 486870 ||  || — || October 26, 2011 || Haleakala || Pan-STARRS || — || align=right | 1.6 km || 
|-id=871 bgcolor=#fefefe
| 486871 ||  || — || October 5, 2011 || Haleakala || Pan-STARRS || — || align=right data-sort-value="0.96" | 960 m || 
|-id=872 bgcolor=#E9E9E9
| 486872 ||  || — || May 21, 2010 || Mount Lemmon || Mount Lemmon Survey || EUN || align=right data-sort-value="0.93" | 930 m || 
|-id=873 bgcolor=#E9E9E9
| 486873 ||  || — || April 17, 2010 || WISE || WISE || — || align=right | 2.6 km || 
|-id=874 bgcolor=#fefefe
| 486874 ||  || — || April 1, 2014 || Kitt Peak || Spacewatch || MAS || align=right data-sort-value="0.67" | 670 m || 
|-id=875 bgcolor=#E9E9E9
| 486875 ||  || — || April 11, 2010 || WISE || WISE || KRM || align=right | 3.0 km || 
|-id=876 bgcolor=#E9E9E9
| 486876 ||  || — || October 26, 2011 || Haleakala || Pan-STARRS || — || align=right | 1.7 km || 
|-id=877 bgcolor=#fefefe
| 486877 ||  || — || April 4, 2014 || Haleakala || Pan-STARRS || — || align=right data-sort-value="0.89" | 890 m || 
|-id=878 bgcolor=#E9E9E9
| 486878 ||  || — || October 26, 2011 || Haleakala || Pan-STARRS || — || align=right data-sort-value="0.93" | 930 m || 
|-id=879 bgcolor=#fefefe
| 486879 ||  || — || March 11, 2007 || Kitt Peak || Spacewatch || — || align=right data-sort-value="0.76" | 760 m || 
|-id=880 bgcolor=#d6d6d6
| 486880 ||  || — || May 7, 2014 || Haleakala || Pan-STARRS || EOS || align=right | 1.8 km || 
|-id=881 bgcolor=#fefefe
| 486881 ||  || — || September 18, 2011 || Mount Lemmon || Mount Lemmon Survey || V || align=right data-sort-value="0.55" | 550 m || 
|-id=882 bgcolor=#E9E9E9
| 486882 ||  || — || January 3, 2013 || Haleakala || Pan-STARRS || MAR || align=right | 1.2 km || 
|-id=883 bgcolor=#fefefe
| 486883 ||  || — || November 30, 2008 || Kitt Peak || Spacewatch || — || align=right data-sort-value="0.86" | 860 m || 
|-id=884 bgcolor=#E9E9E9
| 486884 ||  || — || May 7, 2014 || Haleakala || Pan-STARRS || — || align=right | 1.5 km || 
|-id=885 bgcolor=#fefefe
| 486885 ||  || — || December 1, 2008 || Kitt Peak || Spacewatch || — || align=right data-sort-value="0.90" | 900 m || 
|-id=886 bgcolor=#fefefe
| 486886 ||  || — || July 4, 2010 || WISE || WISE || — || align=right | 1.7 km || 
|-id=887 bgcolor=#fefefe
| 486887 ||  || — || February 28, 2014 || Haleakala || Pan-STARRS || — || align=right data-sort-value="0.62" | 620 m || 
|-id=888 bgcolor=#fefefe
| 486888 ||  || — || September 23, 2011 || Haleakala || Pan-STARRS || — || align=right data-sort-value="0.77" | 770 m || 
|-id=889 bgcolor=#E9E9E9
| 486889 ||  || — || May 7, 2014 || Haleakala || Pan-STARRS || — || align=right | 1.1 km || 
|-id=890 bgcolor=#fefefe
| 486890 ||  || — || December 5, 2005 || Mount Lemmon || Mount Lemmon Survey || NYS || align=right data-sort-value="0.60" | 600 m || 
|-id=891 bgcolor=#fefefe
| 486891 ||  || — || October 25, 2005 || Kitt Peak || Spacewatch || — || align=right data-sort-value="0.78" | 780 m || 
|-id=892 bgcolor=#fefefe
| 486892 ||  || — || July 28, 2011 || Haleakala || Pan-STARRS || — || align=right data-sort-value="0.86" | 860 m || 
|-id=893 bgcolor=#fefefe
| 486893 ||  || — || January 31, 2006 || Kitt Peak || Spacewatch || — || align=right data-sort-value="0.68" | 680 m || 
|-id=894 bgcolor=#fefefe
| 486894 ||  || — || April 3, 2014 || Haleakala || Pan-STARRS || — || align=right data-sort-value="0.87" | 870 m || 
|-id=895 bgcolor=#E9E9E9
| 486895 ||  || — || October 26, 2011 || Haleakala || Pan-STARRS || — || align=right | 1.6 km || 
|-id=896 bgcolor=#fefefe
| 486896 ||  || — || March 31, 2014 || Kitt Peak || Spacewatch || V || align=right data-sort-value="0.58" | 580 m || 
|-id=897 bgcolor=#E9E9E9
| 486897 ||  || — || May 7, 2014 || Haleakala || Pan-STARRS || — || align=right | 2.1 km || 
|-id=898 bgcolor=#d6d6d6
| 486898 ||  || — || March 8, 2013 || Haleakala || Pan-STARRS || EOS || align=right | 1.6 km || 
|-id=899 bgcolor=#fefefe
| 486899 ||  || — || June 24, 2010 || WISE || WISE || — || align=right | 2.2 km || 
|-id=900 bgcolor=#fefefe
| 486900 ||  || — || April 24, 2003 || Kitt Peak || Spacewatch || — || align=right | 1.6 km || 
|}

486901–487000 

|-bgcolor=#E9E9E9
| 486901 ||  || — || May 7, 2014 || Haleakala || Pan-STARRS || — || align=right | 1.0 km || 
|-id=902 bgcolor=#fefefe
| 486902 ||  || — || November 6, 2012 || Kitt Peak || Spacewatch || — || align=right data-sort-value="0.58" | 580 m || 
|-id=903 bgcolor=#fefefe
| 486903 ||  || — || September 4, 2008 || Kitt Peak || Spacewatch || — || align=right data-sort-value="0.85" | 850 m || 
|-id=904 bgcolor=#fefefe
| 486904 ||  || — || March 29, 2007 || Kitt Peak || Spacewatch || — || align=right data-sort-value="0.59" | 590 m || 
|-id=905 bgcolor=#E9E9E9
| 486905 ||  || — || March 2, 2009 || Mount Lemmon || Mount Lemmon Survey || — || align=right | 1.5 km || 
|-id=906 bgcolor=#fefefe
| 486906 ||  || — || April 21, 2014 || Kitt Peak || Spacewatch || — || align=right data-sort-value="0.75" | 750 m || 
|-id=907 bgcolor=#E9E9E9
| 486907 ||  || — || October 15, 2007 || Catalina || CSS || — || align=right | 1.1 km || 
|-id=908 bgcolor=#fefefe
| 486908 ||  || — || March 3, 2006 || Kitt Peak || Spacewatch || — || align=right data-sort-value="0.72" | 720 m || 
|-id=909 bgcolor=#fefefe
| 486909 ||  || — || May 7, 2014 || Haleakala || Pan-STARRS || — || align=right | 1.1 km || 
|-id=910 bgcolor=#E9E9E9
| 486910 ||  || — || October 25, 2011 || Haleakala || Pan-STARRS || — || align=right | 1.0 km || 
|-id=911 bgcolor=#fefefe
| 486911 ||  || — || February 15, 2010 || Mount Lemmon || Mount Lemmon Survey || — || align=right data-sort-value="0.74" | 740 m || 
|-id=912 bgcolor=#fefefe
| 486912 ||  || — || September 19, 2011 || Haleakala || Pan-STARRS || V || align=right data-sort-value="0.57" | 570 m || 
|-id=913 bgcolor=#fefefe
| 486913 ||  || — || January 28, 2006 || Kitt Peak || Spacewatch || — || align=right data-sort-value="0.86" | 860 m || 
|-id=914 bgcolor=#E9E9E9
| 486914 ||  || — || May 7, 2014 || Haleakala || Pan-STARRS || — || align=right | 1.5 km || 
|-id=915 bgcolor=#E9E9E9
| 486915 ||  || — || October 6, 2002 || Socorro || LINEAR || — || align=right | 1.1 km || 
|-id=916 bgcolor=#fefefe
| 486916 ||  || — || January 26, 2006 || Kitt Peak || Spacewatch || — || align=right data-sort-value="0.62" | 620 m || 
|-id=917 bgcolor=#fefefe
| 486917 ||  || — || September 21, 2011 || Mount Lemmon || Mount Lemmon Survey || — || align=right data-sort-value="0.64" | 640 m || 
|-id=918 bgcolor=#E9E9E9
| 486918 ||  || — || April 10, 2014 || Haleakala || Pan-STARRS || — || align=right | 1.9 km || 
|-id=919 bgcolor=#fefefe
| 486919 ||  || — || August 27, 2011 || Haleakala || Pan-STARRS || — || align=right data-sort-value="0.69" | 690 m || 
|-id=920 bgcolor=#d6d6d6
| 486920 ||  || — || May 6, 2014 || Haleakala || Pan-STARRS || — || align=right | 4.2 km || 
|-id=921 bgcolor=#fefefe
| 486921 ||  || — || January 28, 2010 || WISE || WISE || — || align=right | 2.9 km || 
|-id=922 bgcolor=#E9E9E9
| 486922 ||  || — || October 2, 2006 || Mount Lemmon || Mount Lemmon Survey || — || align=right | 1.8 km || 
|-id=923 bgcolor=#E9E9E9
| 486923 ||  || — || September 12, 2010 || La Sagra || OAM Obs. || EUN || align=right | 1.1 km || 
|-id=924 bgcolor=#d6d6d6
| 486924 ||  || — || February 1, 2006 || Kitt Peak || Spacewatch || — || align=right | 3.0 km || 
|-id=925 bgcolor=#fefefe
| 486925 ||  || — || June 11, 2011 || Haleakala || Pan-STARRS || — || align=right data-sort-value="0.73" | 730 m || 
|-id=926 bgcolor=#E9E9E9
| 486926 ||  || — || May 6, 2014 || Haleakala || Pan-STARRS || EUN || align=right | 1.2 km || 
|-id=927 bgcolor=#E9E9E9
| 486927 ||  || — || September 18, 2010 || Mount Lemmon || Mount Lemmon Survey || — || align=right | 1.5 km || 
|-id=928 bgcolor=#E9E9E9
| 486928 ||  || — || June 3, 2014 || Haleakala || Pan-STARRS || MAR || align=right | 1.4 km || 
|-id=929 bgcolor=#E9E9E9
| 486929 ||  || — || October 20, 2011 || Catalina || CSS || MAR || align=right data-sort-value="0.88" | 880 m || 
|-id=930 bgcolor=#d6d6d6
| 486930 ||  || — || January 16, 2007 || Mount Lemmon || Mount Lemmon Survey || — || align=right | 2.5 km || 
|-id=931 bgcolor=#E9E9E9
| 486931 ||  || — || December 30, 2007 || Mount Lemmon || Mount Lemmon Survey || — || align=right | 1.6 km || 
|-id=932 bgcolor=#d6d6d6
| 486932 ||  || — || January 19, 2012 || Haleakala || Pan-STARRS || critical || align=right | 3.2 km || 
|-id=933 bgcolor=#fefefe
| 486933 ||  || — || January 7, 2013 || Kitt Peak || Spacewatch || V || align=right data-sort-value="0.69" | 690 m || 
|-id=934 bgcolor=#E9E9E9
| 486934 ||  || — || October 25, 2011 || Haleakala || Pan-STARRS || — || align=right data-sort-value="0.95" | 950 m || 
|-id=935 bgcolor=#fefefe
| 486935 ||  || — || April 3, 2014 || Haleakala || Pan-STARRS || — || align=right data-sort-value="0.68" | 680 m || 
|-id=936 bgcolor=#d6d6d6
| 486936 ||  || — || February 3, 2012 || Haleakala || Pan-STARRS || — || align=right | 2.3 km || 
|-id=937 bgcolor=#d6d6d6
| 486937 ||  || — || January 19, 2012 || Haleakala || Pan-STARRS || — || align=right | 3.3 km || 
|-id=938 bgcolor=#E9E9E9
| 486938 ||  || — || June 4, 2014 || Haleakala || Pan-STARRS || — || align=right | 1.3 km || 
|-id=939 bgcolor=#E9E9E9
| 486939 ||  || — || January 10, 2008 || Mount Lemmon || Mount Lemmon Survey || — || align=right | 1.4 km || 
|-id=940 bgcolor=#d6d6d6
| 486940 ||  || — || January 30, 2010 || WISE || WISE || — || align=right | 2.7 km || 
|-id=941 bgcolor=#d6d6d6
| 486941 ||  || — || May 3, 2008 || Mount Lemmon || Mount Lemmon Survey || — || align=right | 2.4 km || 
|-id=942 bgcolor=#fefefe
| 486942 ||  || — || February 14, 2010 || Mount Lemmon || Mount Lemmon Survey || — || align=right data-sort-value="0.87" | 870 m || 
|-id=943 bgcolor=#E9E9E9
| 486943 ||  || — || June 20, 2014 || Haleakala || Pan-STARRS || MAR || align=right | 1.1 km || 
|-id=944 bgcolor=#d6d6d6
| 486944 ||  || — || April 10, 2013 || Haleakala || Pan-STARRS || — || align=right | 2.4 km || 
|-id=945 bgcolor=#fefefe
| 486945 ||  || — || January 23, 2006 || Kitt Peak || Spacewatch || — || align=right data-sort-value="0.79" | 790 m || 
|-id=946 bgcolor=#d6d6d6
| 486946 ||  || — || May 7, 2014 || Haleakala || Pan-STARRS || — || align=right | 3.1 km || 
|-id=947 bgcolor=#d6d6d6
| 486947 ||  || — || April 16, 2013 || Haleakala || Pan-STARRS || — || align=right | 3.1 km || 
|-id=948 bgcolor=#E9E9E9
| 486948 ||  || — || June 3, 2014 || Haleakala || Pan-STARRS || — || align=right | 1.8 km || 
|-id=949 bgcolor=#E9E9E9
| 486949 ||  || — || June 3, 2014 || Haleakala || Pan-STARRS || — || align=right | 1.3 km || 
|-id=950 bgcolor=#fefefe
| 486950 ||  || — || February 8, 2013 || Haleakala || Pan-STARRS || — || align=right data-sort-value="0.91" | 910 m || 
|-id=951 bgcolor=#E9E9E9
| 486951 ||  || — || April 14, 2005 || Kitt Peak || Spacewatch || — || align=right | 1.1 km || 
|-id=952 bgcolor=#d6d6d6
| 486952 ||  || — || January 15, 2010 || WISE || WISE || — || align=right | 4.3 km || 
|-id=953 bgcolor=#fefefe
| 486953 ||  || — || March 2, 2009 || Mount Lemmon || Mount Lemmon Survey || — || align=right | 1.0 km || 
|-id=954 bgcolor=#E9E9E9
| 486954 ||  || — || November 18, 2007 || Mount Lemmon || Mount Lemmon Survey || — || align=right | 1.5 km || 
|-id=955 bgcolor=#d6d6d6
| 486955 ||  || — || June 2, 2014 || Mount Lemmon || Mount Lemmon Survey || — || align=right | 2.5 km || 
|-id=956 bgcolor=#d6d6d6
| 486956 ||  || — || June 29, 2014 || Haleakala || Pan-STARRS || — || align=right | 2.3 km || 
|-id=957 bgcolor=#d6d6d6
| 486957 ||  || — || May 12, 2013 || Mount Lemmon || Mount Lemmon Survey || — || align=right | 2.6 km || 
|-id=958 bgcolor=#C2E0FF
| 486958 Arrokoth ||  ||  || June 26, 2014 || HST || M. W. Buie, New Horizons KBO Search || cubewano (cold)critical || align=right | 27 km || 
|-id=959 bgcolor=#d6d6d6
| 486959 ||  || — || February 13, 2007 || Mount Lemmon || Mount Lemmon Survey || — || align=right | 2.9 km || 
|-id=960 bgcolor=#d6d6d6
| 486960 ||  || — || June 22, 2014 || Kitt Peak || Spacewatch || BRA || align=right | 1.2 km || 
|-id=961 bgcolor=#E9E9E9
| 486961 ||  || — || June 21, 2014 || Haleakala || Pan-STARRS || — || align=right | 2.2 km || 
|-id=962 bgcolor=#E9E9E9
| 486962 ||  || — || May 20, 2010 || WISE || WISE || — || align=right | 2.2 km || 
|-id=963 bgcolor=#fefefe
| 486963 ||  || — || March 5, 2006 || Kitt Peak || Spacewatch || — || align=right data-sort-value="0.71" | 710 m || 
|-id=964 bgcolor=#E9E9E9
| 486964 ||  || — || December 31, 2007 || Mount Lemmon || Mount Lemmon Survey || — || align=right | 1.4 km || 
|-id=965 bgcolor=#d6d6d6
| 486965 ||  || — || May 27, 2014 || Mount Lemmon || Mount Lemmon Survey || — || align=right | 3.2 km || 
|-id=966 bgcolor=#E9E9E9
| 486966 ||  || — || November 19, 2007 || Kitt Peak || Spacewatch || EUN || align=right | 2.0 km || 
|-id=967 bgcolor=#E9E9E9
| 486967 ||  || — || September 16, 2006 || Catalina || CSS || — || align=right | 1.5 km || 
|-id=968 bgcolor=#d6d6d6
| 486968 ||  || — || May 6, 2014 || Haleakala || Pan-STARRS || — || align=right | 2.8 km || 
|-id=969 bgcolor=#fefefe
| 486969 ||  || — || May 11, 2010 || Mount Lemmon || Mount Lemmon Survey || — || align=right data-sort-value="0.87" | 870 m || 
|-id=970 bgcolor=#d6d6d6
| 486970 ||  || — || June 5, 2014 || Haleakala || Pan-STARRS || — || align=right | 2.7 km || 
|-id=971 bgcolor=#fefefe
| 486971 ||  || — || March 24, 2006 || Kitt Peak || Spacewatch || — || align=right data-sort-value="0.78" | 780 m || 
|-id=972 bgcolor=#fefefe
| 486972 ||  || — || May 9, 2007 || Mount Lemmon || Mount Lemmon Survey || — || align=right data-sort-value="0.87" | 870 m || 
|-id=973 bgcolor=#E9E9E9
| 486973 ||  || — || June 3, 2014 || Haleakala || Pan-STARRS || ADE || align=right | 1.9 km || 
|-id=974 bgcolor=#fefefe
| 486974 ||  || — || March 18, 2010 || WISE || WISE || — || align=right | 2.3 km || 
|-id=975 bgcolor=#E9E9E9
| 486975 ||  || — || March 31, 2013 || Mount Lemmon || Mount Lemmon Survey || — || align=right | 1.8 km || 
|-id=976 bgcolor=#E9E9E9
| 486976 ||  || — || June 13, 2005 || Mount Lemmon || Mount Lemmon Survey || — || align=right | 2.4 km || 
|-id=977 bgcolor=#E9E9E9
| 486977 ||  || — || July 2, 2014 || Haleakala || Pan-STARRS || — || align=right | 2.1 km || 
|-id=978 bgcolor=#d6d6d6
| 486978 ||  || — || June 3, 2014 || Haleakala || Pan-STARRS || — || align=right | 2.3 km || 
|-id=979 bgcolor=#d6d6d6
| 486979 ||  || — || December 15, 2010 || Mount Lemmon || Mount Lemmon Survey || — || align=right | 3.6 km || 
|-id=980 bgcolor=#E9E9E9
| 486980 ||  || — || May 7, 2014 || Haleakala || Pan-STARRS || MAR || align=right | 1.2 km || 
|-id=981 bgcolor=#E9E9E9
| 486981 ||  || — || October 9, 2010 || Mount Lemmon || Mount Lemmon Survey || HOF || align=right | 2.2 km || 
|-id=982 bgcolor=#d6d6d6
| 486982 ||  || — || October 15, 2009 || Catalina || CSS || — || align=right | 3.2 km || 
|-id=983 bgcolor=#d6d6d6
| 486983 ||  || — || July 3, 2014 || Haleakala || Pan-STARRS || — || align=right | 3.5 km || 
|-id=984 bgcolor=#d6d6d6
| 486984 ||  || — || June 22, 2014 || Mount Lemmon || Mount Lemmon Survey || — || align=right | 2.5 km || 
|-id=985 bgcolor=#d6d6d6
| 486985 ||  || — || April 16, 2013 || Haleakala || Pan-STARRS || — || align=right | 2.5 km || 
|-id=986 bgcolor=#E9E9E9
| 486986 ||  || — || April 5, 2005 || Mount Lemmon || Mount Lemmon Survey || — || align=right data-sort-value="0.96" | 960 m || 
|-id=987 bgcolor=#d6d6d6
| 486987 ||  || — || January 25, 2012 || Haleakala || Pan-STARRS || NAE || align=right | 2.4 km || 
|-id=988 bgcolor=#E9E9E9
| 486988 ||  || — || June 3, 2014 || Haleakala || Pan-STARRS || EUN || align=right | 1.1 km || 
|-id=989 bgcolor=#d6d6d6
| 486989 ||  || — || June 24, 2014 || Haleakala || Pan-STARRS || — || align=right | 2.4 km || 
|-id=990 bgcolor=#d6d6d6
| 486990 ||  || — || April 24, 2012 || Haleakala || Pan-STARRS || — || align=right | 3.2 km || 
|-id=991 bgcolor=#E9E9E9
| 486991 ||  || — || October 26, 2011 || Haleakala || Pan-STARRS || — || align=right data-sort-value="0.99" | 990 m || 
|-id=992 bgcolor=#E9E9E9
| 486992 ||  || — || October 24, 2011 || Mount Lemmon || Mount Lemmon Survey || — || align=right | 1.8 km || 
|-id=993 bgcolor=#fefefe
| 486993 ||  || — || February 19, 2009 || Kitt Peak || Spacewatch || — || align=right data-sort-value="0.71" | 710 m || 
|-id=994 bgcolor=#d6d6d6
| 486994 ||  || — || June 27, 2014 || Haleakala || Pan-STARRS || — || align=right | 3.6 km || 
|-id=995 bgcolor=#E9E9E9
| 486995 ||  || — || March 19, 2013 || Haleakala || Pan-STARRS || — || align=right data-sort-value="0.99" | 990 m || 
|-id=996 bgcolor=#E9E9E9
| 486996 ||  || — || August 19, 2006 || Kitt Peak || Spacewatch || MAR || align=right data-sort-value="0.96" | 960 m || 
|-id=997 bgcolor=#d6d6d6
| 486997 ||  || — || April 24, 2007 || Mount Lemmon || Mount Lemmon Survey || — || align=right | 2.9 km || 
|-id=998 bgcolor=#d6d6d6
| 486998 ||  || — || February 2, 2006 || Kitt Peak || Spacewatch || — || align=right | 3.3 km || 
|-id=999 bgcolor=#d6d6d6
| 486999 ||  || — || July 6, 2014 || Haleakala || Pan-STARRS || BRA || align=right | 1.8 km || 
|-id=000 bgcolor=#d6d6d6
| 487000 ||  || — || April 19, 2013 || Haleakala || Pan-STARRS || EOS || align=right | 1.7 km || 
|}

References

External links 
 Discovery Circumstances: Numbered Minor Planets (485001)–(490000) (IAU Minor Planet Center)

0486